= List of sheep breeds =

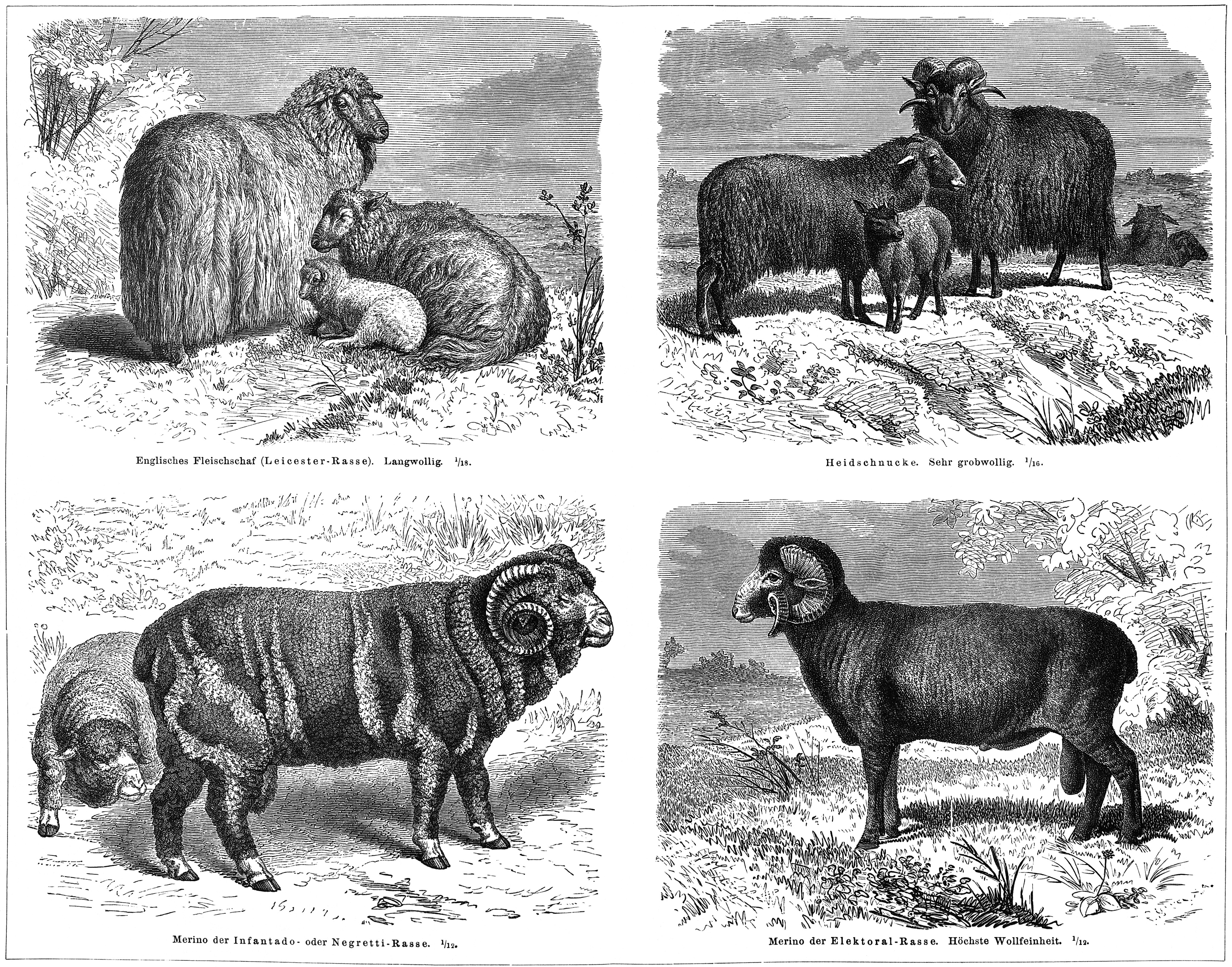
Four breeds of sheep, in the illustrated encyclopedia Meyers Konversationslexikon

This is a list of breeds of domestic sheep. Domestic sheep (Ovis aries) are partially derived from mouflon (Ovis gmelini) stock, and have diverged sufficiently to be considered a different species. Some sheep breeds have a hair coat and are known as haired sheep.

== Domestic sheep breeds ==
Sorted alphabetically.

=== A ===
Name	Picture	Alternative name	Origin	Purpose
Acıpayam			Turkey	Meat, wool
Adal			Ethiopia	Meat
Afghan Arabi (Note: Arabi subtype)			Afghanistan	Meat
Africana		Camura, Colombian Wooless, Pelona, Red African, Rojo Africana, West African	Colombia	Meat, woolly items
Afrikaner		Cape fattest tail	South Africa	Meat, pelts honed
Afrino			South Africa	Meat, wool, crossbreeding
Alai			Kyrgyzstan	Meat, wool
Alcarreña			Spain	Meat
Algarve Churro			Portugal	Meat
Algerian sheep		Ouled Jellal, Western Thin-tailed	Algeria	Meat
Alpines Steinschaf			Germany	Meat, wool, vegetation management
Altay			China	Meat
American Blackbelly			United States	Trophy hunting
Ancon		Otter sheep	United States	
Appenninica		Appenninica, Bariscianese, Chietina Varzese, Perugina del piano	Italy	Meat
Arabi			Iran, Iraq	Meat
Arapawa			New Zealand	Wool
Arkhar-Merino			Kazakhstan	Wool
Armenian Semicoarsewool		Armyanskaya Polugrubosherstnaya	Armenia	Meat, milk
Askanian		Ukrainian: Асканійський, romanized: Askaniysky	Ukraine	Wool
Assaf			Israel	Meat, milk
Aussiedown			Australia	Meat
Australian White			Australia	Meat
Awassi		Ivesi, Baladi, Deiri, Syrian, Ausi, Nuami, Gezirieh	South Eastern Anatolia, Syro-Arabian desert	Milk

=== B ===
Name	Picture	Alternative name	Origin	Purpose
Balkhi			Afghanistan, North-west Pakistan	Meat
Baluchi		Baluchi dumda, Mengali, Taraki, Shinwari, Araghi, Farahani, Kermani, Khorasani, Khurasani, Naeini, Neini, Yazdi	Pakistan, Iran, Afghanistan	Wool
Barbados Blackbelly sheep		Barbados Black Belly, Black Belly, Barbados Barriga Nigra	Barbados	Meat
Bardoka			Kosovo	Milk, meat, wool and research
Basco-Béarnais			Spain, France	Milk
Bellary			Karnataka, India	Wool
Beltex			Belgium, The Netherlands	Meat
Bentheimer Landschaf		Bentheim sheep	Germany	Landscape preservation
Bergamasca			Italy	Meat
Berichon du Cher			France	
Beulah Speckled Face			United Kingdom	Meat
Bibrik			Pakistan	
Biellese		Razza d'Ivrea, Piemontese Alpina	Italy	Meat, milk
Bizet			France	Meat
Blackhead Persian		Swartkoppersie	South Africa	Meat
Blackheaded Somali		Berbera Blackhead	Somalia	
Bleu du Maine		Bazougers, Blauköpfiges Fleischschaf, Bluefaced Maine, Blue-headed Maine, Maine-Anjou, Maine à tête bleue, Mayenne Blue	France	Meat, Wool
Bluefaced Leicester			United Kingdom	Meat
Blue Texel			Netherlands	Meat
Bond			Australia	Wool
Border Leicester			United Kingdom	Meat, wool
Boreray sheep			Scotland	Meat, wool
Bovec sheep		Bovška Ovca, Plezzana, Trentarka, Krainer Steinschaf	Italy	Meat, milk
Braunes Bergschaf		Brown Mountain sheep	Germany	Meat, vegetation management
Brazilian Somali			Brazil	Meat
Brianzola			Italy	Meat
British Milksheep			United Kingdom	Milk
Bündner Oberland		Graubünden, Grisons	Switzerland	Vegetation management

=== C ===
Name	Picture	Alternative name	Origin	Purpose
California Red			United States	Meat, wool
California Variegated Mutant		CVM, Romeldale/CVM	United States	Wool
Cambridge			United Kingdom	meat
Cameroon			West Africa	Meat
Campanian Barbary			Italy	Meat, milk
Canadian Arcott	Canadian Arcott Sheep		Canada	Meat
Cărăbaşă		Black-headed Teleorman Tigaie	Romania	
Castlemilk Moorit		Castlemilk Shetland, Moorit Shetland	Scotland	Hobby
Charmoise			France	Meat
Charollais			France	Meat
Cheviot			Scotland	Meat, wool
Border Cheviot (Note: Cheviot subtype)		South Country Cheviot	United Kingdom	Meat
Brecknock Hill Cheviot		Brecon Cheviot, Sennybridge Cheviot	Wales	Meat
North Country Cheviot			Scotland	Meat
Chios			Island of Chios, Greece	Milk
Cholistani			Pakistan	Meat
Churra		Spanish Churro	Spain	Meat, milk
Cigaja			Croatia	Wool, milk
Cikta			Hungary	Meat
Çine Çaparı			Turkey	
Clun Forest			England	Meat, milk, wool
Coburger Fuchsschaf		Coburg Fox Sheep	Germany	Vegetation management
Columbia			United States	Wool
Comeback			Australia	Meat, wool
Comisana		Lentinese, Red Head, Testa rossa, Faccia rossa	Italy	Milk
Coolalee			Australia	Meat
Coopworth			New Zealand	Meat, wool
Cormo			Australasia	Wool
Corriedale			New Zealand	Meat, wool
Cotswold			United Kingdom	Meat, wool
Criollo		Creole, Chilludo, Colombian, Lucero, Pampa, Tarhumara, Uruguayan, Venezuelan	Central America	Meat

=== D ===
Name	Picture	Alternative name	Origin	Purpose
Dala Fur sheep		Dala pälsfår	Sweden	
Dalesbred			United Kingdom	Meat, wool
Dagliç			Turkey	Meat, milk
Damani			Pakistan	Meat, wool
Damara			Namibia	Meat
Danish Landrace		Landfår, Klitfår	Denmark	Wool
Debouillet			United States	Wool
Derbyshire Gritstone			United Kingdom	Meat
Deutsches Bergschaf		Weißes Bergschaf, White Mountain, Deutsches Weisses Bergschaf	Germany	Meat, wool
Devon Closewool			United Kingdom	Meat
Devon Longwoolled		Devon Longwool	United Kingdom	Meat, wool
Dohne Merino		Dohne, El Dohne Merino	South Africa	Meat, wool
Dorper			South Africa	Meat
Dorset		Dorset Horn, Dorset Horned	United Kingdom	Meat
Dorset Down			United Kingdom	Meat
Drenth Heath Sheep		Drents Heideschaap	Netherlands	Vegetation management
Drysdale			New Zealand	Wool
Duben sheep			Bulgaria	wool

=== E ===
Name	Picture	Alternative name	Origin	Purpose
Easycare			United Kingdom	Meat
East Friesian		Ostfriesisches Milchschaf	Germany	Milk
Edilbay		Edilbaevskaya, Edilbaev	Kazakhstan	Meat, tail fat
Elliottdale			Tasmania	Meat, Wool
English Leicester		Bakewell Leicester, Dishley Leicester, Improved Leicester, Leicester, Leicester Longwool, New Leicester	England	Meat
Estonian Ruhnu		Ruhnu maalammas	Estonia	Meat, wool
Elinpelin sheep		-	Bulgaria	wool
Exlana sheep			United Kingdom	meat, wool
Exmoor Horn			Exmoor	Meat

=== F ===
Name	Picture	Alternative name	Origin	Purpose
Fabrianese			Italy	Meat, milk
Faroe		Faroese	Faroe Islands	Meat, wool
Fat-tailed sheep (group of breeds)			Africa, Middle East, Near East, Pakistan, Northern India, Western China, Mongolia	Meat
Finnsheep		Suomenlammas, Finnish Landrace	Finland	Meat, Wool, Milk, Landscape Management
Flanders Milk sheep			Belgium	
Forystufé		Leadersheep, Forystukind	Iceland	Genetic conservation, herd management
French Alpine sheep			France	
Friesian Milk sheep			Netherlands	
Fuglestad			Norway	

=== G ===
Name	Picture	Alternative name	Origin	Purpose
Gaddi		Kangra Valley, Bhadarwah	India	Wool
Galician		Ovella galega	Spain	Meat, milk
Galway			Ireland	Meat
Gansu Alpine Fine-wool		Northwestern Chinese Merino, North-West China Merino	China	Wool
Gentile di Puglia		Merinos d'Italia	Italy	Wool
German Whiteheaded Mutton		Weißkopf, Weißköpfiges Fleischschaf	Germany	Meat, wool
Gotland		Gotland Pälsfår, Gotland pelt	Sweden	Meat, wool
Gökçeada			Turkey	
Greenlandic sheep		kalaallit savaataat, sava	Greenland	Meat, wool
Greyface Dartmoor			United Kingdom	Meat
Grey Troender		Grå trøndersau	Norway	Wool
Gromark			Australia	Meat, wool
Gulf Coast Native		Louisiana Scrub, Pineywoods Native	Gulf Coast, United States	
Guligas			Uzbekistan	
Guirra			Mediterranean coast of Spain	Meat
Gute		Gutefår	Sweden	Genetic conservation

=== H ===
Name	Picture	Alternative name	Origin	Purpose
Hampshire		Hampshire Down	United Kingdom	Meat
Han			Mongolia, China	
Langzhou Large-tail Han (Note: Han subtype)			Northern China	
Small-tail Han			China	Meat
Hanzhong			China	
Harnai			Pakistan	
Hasht Nagri			Pakistan	Meat, wool
Hazaragie			Afghanistan	Meat
Hebridean		St. Kilda sheep	Scotland	Vegetation management
Heidschnucke		Family of sheep including the three breeds below	Germany	Meat, wool, vegetation management
Graue gehörnte Heidschnucke (Note: Heidschnucke subtype)		Grey Horned Heath	Germany	Meat, wool, vegetation management
Moorschnucke		White Polled Heath	Germany	Meat, wool, vegetation management
Weiße gehörnte Heidschnucke		White Horned Heath	Germany	Meat, wool, vegetation management
Herdwick			England	Meat
Herik			Turkey	
Hill Radnor			Wales	Meat
Hog Island			United States	Wool
Hu			China	

=== I ===
Name	Picture	Alternative name	Origin	Purpose
Icelandic sheep		íslenska sauðkindin	Iceland	Meat, milk, wool
Inner Mongolian wool			China	
Île-de-France		Dishley Merino	France	Meat
Istrian milk		Istrian Pramenka	Croatia, Slovenia	Meat, milk

=== J ===
Name	Picture	Alternative name	Origin	Purpose
Jacob			United Kingdom	Meat, wool, hide, pet
Jezersko–Solčava sheep		Brillenschaf, Carinthian sheep, Seelaenderschaf, Spectacles Sheep	Slovenia	Meat
Juraschaf			Switzerland	

=== K ===
Name	Picture	Alternative name	Origin	Purpose
Kachhi			Pakistan	
Kajli			Pakistan	Meat, milk, wool
Kamakuyruk			Turkey	
Karacabey Merino			Turkey	
Karakul			Central Asia	Meat, milk, wool, hide
Karayaka			Turkey	Meat, milk, wool
Kärntner Brillenschaf		Spectacled Alpine Sheep	Austria	Meat, wool, hide
Katahdin			United States	Meat
Kempen Heath			Netherlands	
Kerry Hill			Wales	Meat
Kihnu Native		Kihnu maalammas	Estonia	Wool
Kıvırcık			Turkey	
Kooka			Pakistan	Milk
Kashmir Merino			Kashmir	Wool
Karagouniko			Greece	

=== L ===
Name	Picture	Alternative name	Origin	Purpose
Lacaune			France	Milk
Ladoum			Senegal	
Landais			France	
Langhe			Italy	
Lati			Pakistan	
Latxa		Lacha	Spain	Milk
Leccese		Moscia Leccese	Italy	Wool, milk
Leineschaf			Germany	Meat, wool
Lincoln		Lincoln Longwool	England	Wool
Lithuanian Black-headed		Lietuvos vietines siurksciavilnês	Lithuania	Meat, wool
Llanwenog			Wales	Meat
Lleyn		Dafad Llŷn	Wales	Meat
Lohi			Pakistan	Wool
Lonk		Improved Haslingden	England	Meat, wool
Luzein sheep			Switzerland	

=== M ===
Name	Picture	Alternative name	Origin	Purpose
Magra sheep		Bikaneri Chokhla, Chakri, Bikaneri	Rajasthan, India	Wool
Maltese			Malta	
Manchega			Spain	Meat, milk
Manech			France	
Marwari			India	Meat, wool
Manx Loaghtan		Loaghtyn, Loghtan	Isle of Man	Wool
Masai			Kenya	
Masham			England	Meat, wool
Massese sheep			Italy	Milk
Meatmaster			South Africa	Meat
Mehraban			Iran	Meat
Merinizzata Italiana			Italy	Meat, wool
Merino			Spain, Turkey	Meat, wool
Argentine Merino (Note: Merino subtype)			Argentina	Meat, wool
Arles Merino			France	Meat, wool
Booroola Merino			Australia	Wool, research
Delaine Merino			United States	Wool
East Merino sheep			France	Meat, wool
Karacabey Merino			Turkey	
Medium-wool Merino			Spain	
Merinofleischschaf				
Merinolandschaf			Germany	Meat, wool
Merino Longwool			Spain	
Poll Merino			Australia	Meat, wool
South African Merino			South Africa	Meat, wool
South African Meat Merino		SAMM	South Africa	Meat, wool
Strong Wool Merino			Spain	
Transylvanian Merino			Romania	
Ming Black			China	
Moghani			Iran	
Montadale			United States	Meat, wool
Morada Nova		Brazilian Woolless	Brazil	Meat
Moles				

=== N ===
Name	Picture	Alternative name	Origin	Purpose
Najdi		Nejdi	Saudi Arabia	Meat, milk, wool
Namaqua Afrikaner			South Africa	Meat, pelts
Nali		Western India	India	Wool
Navajo-Churro sheep			United States	Wool
Nederlandse Bonte Schaap		Dutch Spotted Sheep	Netherlands	meat, wool
Nellore		palia, jodipi, dora	India	Meat
Newfoundland		Newfoundland Local	Canada	
Nilgiri			India	
Noire du Velay			France	Meat
Nolana sheep			Germany	
Norfolk Horn		Blackface Norfolk Horned, Norfolk Horned, Old Norfolk, Old Norfolk Horned	United Kingdom	Meat
North Ronaldsay		Orkney	Scotland	Wool
Northern European short-tailed sheep (group of breeds)			Baltic states, British Isles, Scandinavia, Germany, Russia	Meat, milk, wool
Norwegian Fur			Norway	

=== O ===
Name	Picture	Alternative name	Origin	Purpose
Orkhon			Mongolia	Wool
Ossimi			Egypt	
Ouessant		Ushant, Breton Island Dwarf	France	Wool, hobby
Oula			Tibet; China	
Oxford		Oxford Down	United Kingdom	Meat

=== P ===
Name	Picture	Alternative name	Origin	Purpose
Pag Island		Paška ovca	Croatia	Meat, milk
Pagliarola			Italy	
Panama			United States	Meat
Pedi sheep		Bapedi	South Africa	Meat
Pelibüey		Cubano Rojo	Caribbean, Mexico, South America	Meat
Perendale			New Zealand	Meat
Pinzirita			Sicily	Milk
Pitt Island			Chatham Islands, New Zealand	Wool
Polwarth			Australia	Meat, wool
Polypay			United States	Meat, wool
Portland			England	Meat
Pramenka		Lička, Istarska, Kupreška or Dubska pramenka	Bosnia and Herzegovina, Croatia	Meat, milk, wool
Priangan		Garut	Indonesia	Meat, ram fighting
Polish Heath			Poland	
Poll Dorset			Australia	Meat
Polled Dorset			United States	Meat
Pomeranian Coarsewool Sheep		Pomeranian Sheep, Rauhwolliges Pommersches Landschaf	Germany	Meat, vegetation management

=== Q ===
Name	Picture	Alternative name	Origin	Purpose
Qashqai			China	
Qiaoke			China	
Qinghai Black Tibetan			China	
Qinghai Semifinewool			China	
Quadrella			Italy	
Quanglin Large-Tail			China	

=== R ===
Name	Picture	Alternative name	Origin	Purpose
Rabo Largo			Brazil	
Racka		Ovce cápová, Cápovice	Hungary	Meat, milk, wool
Rahmany sheep		El-rahmani	Egypt	Meat, milk, wool
Rambouillet		Rambouillet Merino, French Merino	France	Meat, wool
Rasa Aragonesa			Aragón	Meat
Red Engadine		Engadine	Switzerland	
Red Karaman			Turkey	
Red Maasai			East Africa	Meat
Rhoen sheep			Germany	vegetation management
Rideau Arcott			Canada	
Romanov			Russia	Meat
Romney sheep		Romney Marsh	United Kingdom	Meat, wool
Roslag		Roslagsfår	Sweden	Meat, wool
Rouge de l'Ouest		Tête rouge du Maine	France	Meat
Rouge du Roussillon		Roussillion Red	France	Meat, wool
Rough Fell			United Kingdom	Meat
Roux du Valais		Walliser Landschaf, Roux du Pays	Switzerland	Meat, wool
Ruda			Albania, Croatia	Wool
Rya		Ryafår, Swedish Carpet Wool Sheep	Sweden	Wool
Ryeland			United Kingdom	Meat
Rygja			Norway	

=== S ===
Name	Picture	Alternative name	Origin	Purpose
Sahel-type			West Africa	
Sakiz		Çesme	Turkey	Wool
Saraja			Turkmenistan	Wool, meat
Santa Cruz			Santa Cruz Island, United States	Wool
Santa Inês			Brazil	Meat
Sardinian		Brabei Sarda, Pecora Sarda	Italy	Milk
Sardi (Moroccan sheep)			Morocco	Meat, milk, wool
Schoonebeker			Netherlands	
Schwarzköpfiges Fleischschaf			Germany	
Schwarzes Bergschaf			Germany	
Scottish Blackface		Blackfaced Highland, Kerry, Linton, Scotch Blackface, Scotch Horn, Scottish Highland, Scottish Mountain	Scotland	Meat
Scottish Dunface		Scottish Tanface, Old Scottish Short-wool	Scotland (extinct)	Meat, wool
Serrai	Serres+breed	Serraika, Serron	Greece, Serres	Meat, milk, wool
Shetland			Shetland Islands	Meat, wool
Shropshire			United Kingdom	Meat
Sicilian Barbary			Sicily	
Skudde		skudden	Estonia, Germany, Latvia, Lithuania, Switzerland	Meat, vegetation management, felting
Soay			Scotland	Meat
Somali Arab			Somalia	
Sopravissana			Italy	Milk
South Devon			United Kingdom	
South Dorset			United Kingdom	
South Hampshire			United Kingdom	
Southdown			United Kingdom	Meat
South Wales Mountain			Wales	
Spælsau		Old Norwegian Short Tail Landrace	Norway	Meat
Spiegel			Switzerland	
St. Croix		Virgin Island white	Virgin Islands	Meat
Steigar			Norway	
Steinschaf			Austria; Germany; Slovenia	
Suffolk			United Kingdom	Meat
Sumavska			Czech Republic	Meat, milk, wool
Swaledale			United Kingdom	Meat, wool
Swedish Fur			Sweden	
Swifter			Netherlands	
Schweizer Schwarzbraunes Bergschaf			Switzerland	
Schweizer Alpenschaf			Switzerland	
Såne			Denmark	Meat, pelt

=== T ===
Name	Picture	Alternative name	Origin	Purpose
Taleshi			Iran	Meat
Tan			China	Hides, meat
Targhee			United States	Wool
Tautra			Norway	
Teeswater			United Kingdom	Meat
TEFRom			New Zealand	Meat, wool
Texel			Netherlands	Meat
Thalli			Pakistan	
Ţigaie			Romania	Meat, milk, wool
Tiroler Steinschaf		Pecora della Roccia Tirolese	Austria	Meat, wool
Touabire			Southern Mauritania; Northern Senegal	
Ţsurcană			Romania	Meat, milk, wool
Tukidale			Tuki Tuki in New Zealand, then Australia	Meat, specialty carpet wool
Tunis		Tunisian Barbary	Tunisia	Meat
Tuj			Turkey	
Türkgeldi			Turkey	

=== U ===
Name	Picture	Alternative name	Origin	Purpose
Uda			Chad, Niger, northern Cameroon, northern Nigeria	Meat

=== V ===
Name	Picture	Alternative name	Origin	Purpose
Valachian sheep		Native Wallachian sheep	Czech Republic	Meat, milk, wool
Valachian Improved sheep			Czech Republic	Meat, milk, wool
Valais Blacknose		Wallis Blacknose, Walliser Schwarznasenschaf, Blacknosed Swiss, Visp, Visperschaf	Switzerland	Meat, wool
Van Rooy		Van Rooy White Persian	South Africa	Meat
Vendéen			France	Meat

=== W ===
Name	Picture	Alternative name	Origin	Purpose
Waldschaf				
Waziri			Pakistan	Meat, wool
Weißes Bergschaf				
Welsh Hill Speckled Face			Wales	
Welsh Mountain sheep		Defaid Mynydd Cymreig	Wales	Meat
Badger Face Welsh Mountain (Note: Welsh Mountain subtype)		Defaid Idloes, Badger Faced Welsh Mountain, Welsh Badger-faced	Wales	Meat
Balwen Welsh Mountain sheep			Wales	Meat
Black Welsh Mountain sheep		Defaid Mynydd Duon	Wales	Meat
South Wales Mountain			Wales	
Wensleydale			England	Meat
West African Dwarf		Djallonke, Fouta Djallon sheep	West Africa and Central Africa	Meat
White Horned Heath			Germany	
White Karaman		Akkaraman	Located in Central Anatolia, provinces adjacent to Eastern Anatolia and Southern Anatolia, the Black Sea region, and the Mediterranean regions close to Central Anatolia.	
White Suffolk			Australia	Meat
Whiteface Dartmoor			United Kingdom	Meat
Whitefaced Woodland		Penistone sheep	England	Meat
White Maritza sheep			Bulgaria	
Wiltipoll			Australia	Meat
Wiltshire Horn			United Kingdom	Meat

=== X ===
Name	Picture	Alternative name	Origin	Purpose
Xalda			Spain	Meat
Xaxi Ardia			Spain	
Xinjiang Finewool			China	Meat, wool

=== Y ===
Name	Picture	Alternative name	Origin	Purpose
Yankasa			Nigeria	Meat
Yellow sheep			Yorkshire	
Yemen White			Yemen	
Yiecheng			China	
Yoroo			Mongolia	
Yunnan Semifinewool			China	

=== Z ===
Name	Picture	Alternative name	Origin	Purpose
Zackel			Hungary	
Zaghawa			Chad & Sudan	
Zaian			Morocco	
Zaïre Long-Legged			Zaire (Democratic Republic of the Congo)	
Zakynthos			Greece	
Zeeland Milk			Netherlands	
Zel			Iran	
Zelazna		Zeleznienska	Poland	Meat
Zemmour			Morocco	
Zeta Yellow			Montenegro	
Zlatusha			Bulgaria	
Zoulay			Morocco	
Zwartbles			Netherlands	Meat, milk, cheese
Zulu sheep		Nguni	South Africa	Meat

== See also ==
- List of cattle breeds
- List of domestic pig breeds
- List of goat breeds
- Lists of domestic animal breeds
