= Damani =

Damani may refer to:

- a breed of goat
- Damani (sheep), found in Khyber Pakhtunkhwa province of Pakistan
- Damani, Iran, a village in Ardabil Province, Iran
- Damani (name), a given name; and an Indian surname in the Maheshwari Hindu caste or from Gujarat

== See also ==
- Damini, a 1993 Indian legal drama film by Rajkumar Santoshi
