= White Suffolk =

Australian breed of sheep

- Conservation status: FAO (2007): not at risk; DAD-IS (2024): extinct
- Country of origin: Australia
- Use: meat

Traits
- Wool colour: white
- Face colour: white
- Horn status: polled

The White Suffolk is a modern Australian breed of domestic sheep. It was bred from 1977 to have the meat-producing qualities of the Suffolk, but without the typical black markings.

== History ==
The White Suffolk was bred by Ewan Roberts, of the University of New South Wales, from 1977. His intention was to create a sheep that had the large size, high ewe fecundity and rapid growth rate of the original British Suffolk, but without the black face and legs and without the occasional dark fibres in the wool which greatly reduced its value in the Australian market. He crossed the Suffolk with the Polled Dorset, and later with the Border Leicester. From the third generation he selectively bred for high growth rate and for the absence of black fibres on the points and in the fleece. A breed society, the Australian White Suffolk Society, was formed in 1985..

A total population of approximately 24000 was reported to DAD-IS for 1992, and in 2007 the conservation status of the breed was listed as 'not at risk'.
