= Orkhon sheep =

Breed of sheep

Orkhon
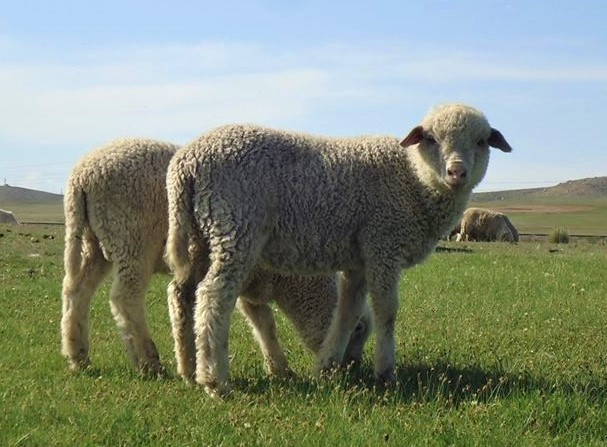
- Orkhon sheep breed, Selenge Province, Mongolia
- Country of origin: Mongolia
- Distribution: Mongolia
- Use: Wool

Traits
- Weight: Male: 80 kg; Female: 58 kg
- Skin color: White
- Wool color: White

Notes
- Developed in 1961

The Orkhon (Mongolian: орхон) is a Mongolian breed of sheep first developed in 1961. This medium, semi-fine wool breed is now reared primarily for wool.

== History ==
In 1942, then-Council of Ministers (Cabinet) of Mongolia issued a resolution to develop domestic fine and semi-fine wool breeds to meet the increased national manufacturing demand. Selection and breeding works started in 1942 with successive cross-breeding of Soviet Tsigai and Altay rams.

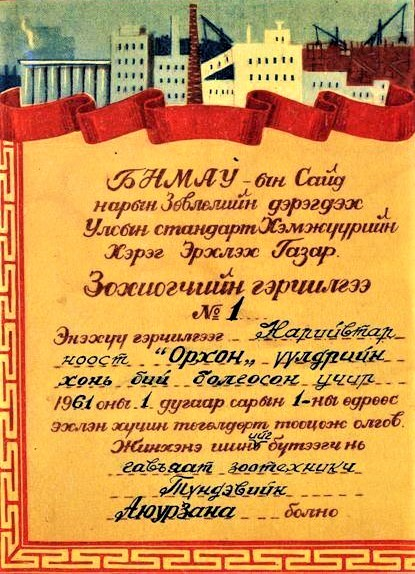
Front page of the first certificate confirming Orkhon sheep breed, January.01.1961

The first certificate confirming the breed was issued on January 1, 1961, by then-Standards and Measurements Authority of People's Republic of Mongolia to the breed's developer, researcher and veterinarian T. Ayurzana (1910-1972).

== Characteristics ==
Both sexes of Orkhon breed display white color, short tail (usually cut at early age), compact body with straight back. On average and at maturity, rams produce 5,6 kg and ewes produce 3,7 kg of semi-fine wool. Average wool length is 8 cm, the average diameter of the Orkhon fiber is 25-31 microns.

Approximately 1.15 lambs per litter. Age at first breeding is 18 months, average liveweight at birth is 4 kg for males and 3.6 kg for females.

This is hardy sheep adapted for Mongolian harsh climate, grazed on pastures all year round.

== Population ==
The current exact size of the Orkhon sheep population is unknown, but estimated at around 3500 heads as of 2018. The main stock of Orkhon breed is now kept in Selenge district of Bulgan Province of Mongolia.

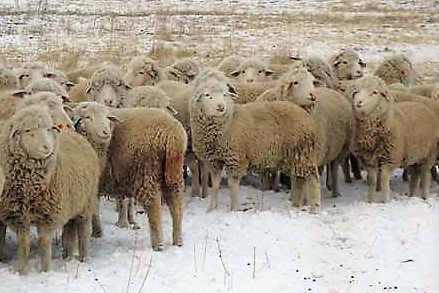
Orkhon sheep on winter pasture, Mongolia.
