= Nilgiri sheep =

Breed of sheep

Nilgiri
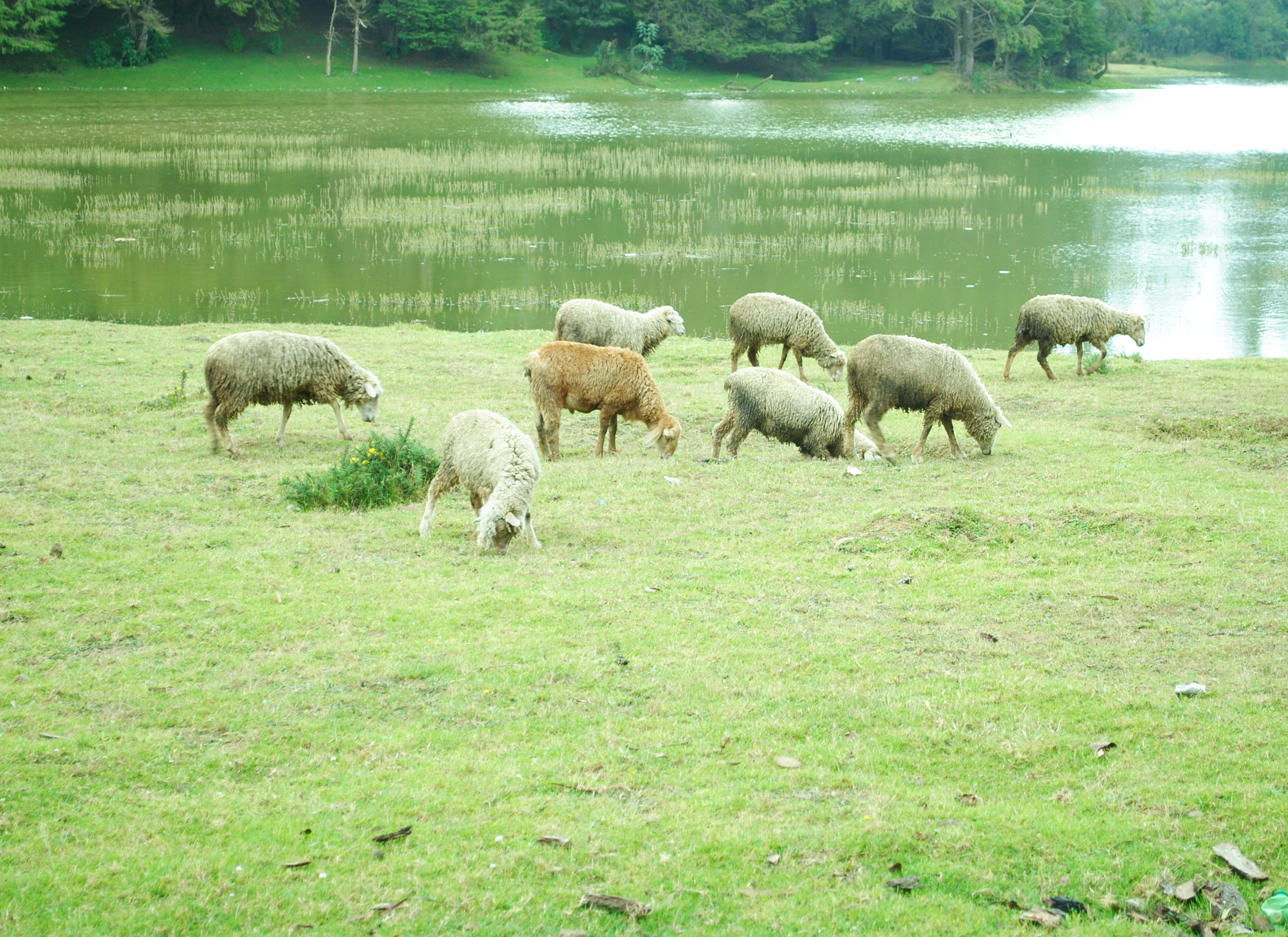
- Grazing on the shores of Ooty Lake.
- Country of origin: India

The Nilgiri is an Indian breed of sheep. It is found only in Nilgiris District of Tamil Nadu State in southern India. It is bred in the hilly parts of Nilgiri and yields fine wool. A national plan has been implemented to save the Nilgiri from extinction by the National Bureau of Animal Genetic Conservation.

== Wool quality and production ==
Some statistics pertaining to the breed are:

- average six months weight of total wool in kilograms 0.615 ± 0.028
- average single strand diameter 27.34 ± 0.077(μ)
- wool density(cm^{2}) 2 199 ± 57
