= Pagliarola =

Italian breed of sheep

- Conservation status: FAO (2007): endangered; DAD-IS (2026): not listed
- Other names: Indigena
- Country of origin: Italy
- Distribution: Abruzzo; Campania; Molise
- Use: triple-purpose: meat, milk, wool

Traits
- Weight: Male: 60 kg; Female: 60 kg
- Height: Male: 65–70 cm; Female: 60–65 cm
- Wool colour: straw-white

The Pagliarola or Indigena is an Italian breed of domestic sheep. It is distributed principally in the Abruzzo, Campania and Molise regions of southern Italy. Until the 1980s it was numerous in those areas, but more recent population data is not available.

== History ==
The Pagliarola is thought to derive from cross-breeding of the local sheep populations of the Abruzzo, Campania and Molise regions of southern Italy with stock of the Gentile di Puglia and Sopravissana breeds. The breed name 'Pagliarola' derives from the paglia or wheat straw traditionally used as a feed supplement during the winter months.

A census by the Consiglio Nazionale delle Ricerche in 1983 found approximately 200000 head; by the mid-1990s the breed had virtually disappeared, principally as a result of indiscriminate cross-breeding with meat sheep of other breeds. In 2007 it was listed as endangered by the Food and Agriculture Organization of the United Nations; in 2026 it was not among the breeds reported to the DAD-IS database. It is not among the forty-two autochthonous local sheep breeds of limited distribution for which a flock-book is kept by the Associazione Nazionale della Pastorizia, the Italian national association of sheep-breeders. There is no breed standard. A conservation programme was started in Abruzzo in 2009.

== Characteristics ==
The Pagliarola is of medium size: ewes stand some 60 to 65 cm at the withers and weigh about 60 kg, rams weigh about the same and stand from 65 to 70 cm at the shoulder. The sheep are generally polled, but rams are occasionally horned. The fleece is coarse and straw-white; it may also be reddish-black. The facial profile is slightly convex, the ears are low-set and of medium length.

== Use ==
It is a triple-purpose breed, reared for meat, for milk and for wool. The milk yield – excluding that taken by the lambs – is some 35 to 45 kg per lactation; the milk is used to make ricotta and other cheeses.

Lambs weigh 4 to 4.5 kg at birth and were traditionally slaughtered at a weight of 10 to 12 kg; wethers were taken to higher weights before slaughter.

Fleece weights are approximately 1–1.2 kg for ewes and 2–2.5 kg for rams, with a staple length of roughly 200 mm.
