= Ovella galega =

Breed of sheep

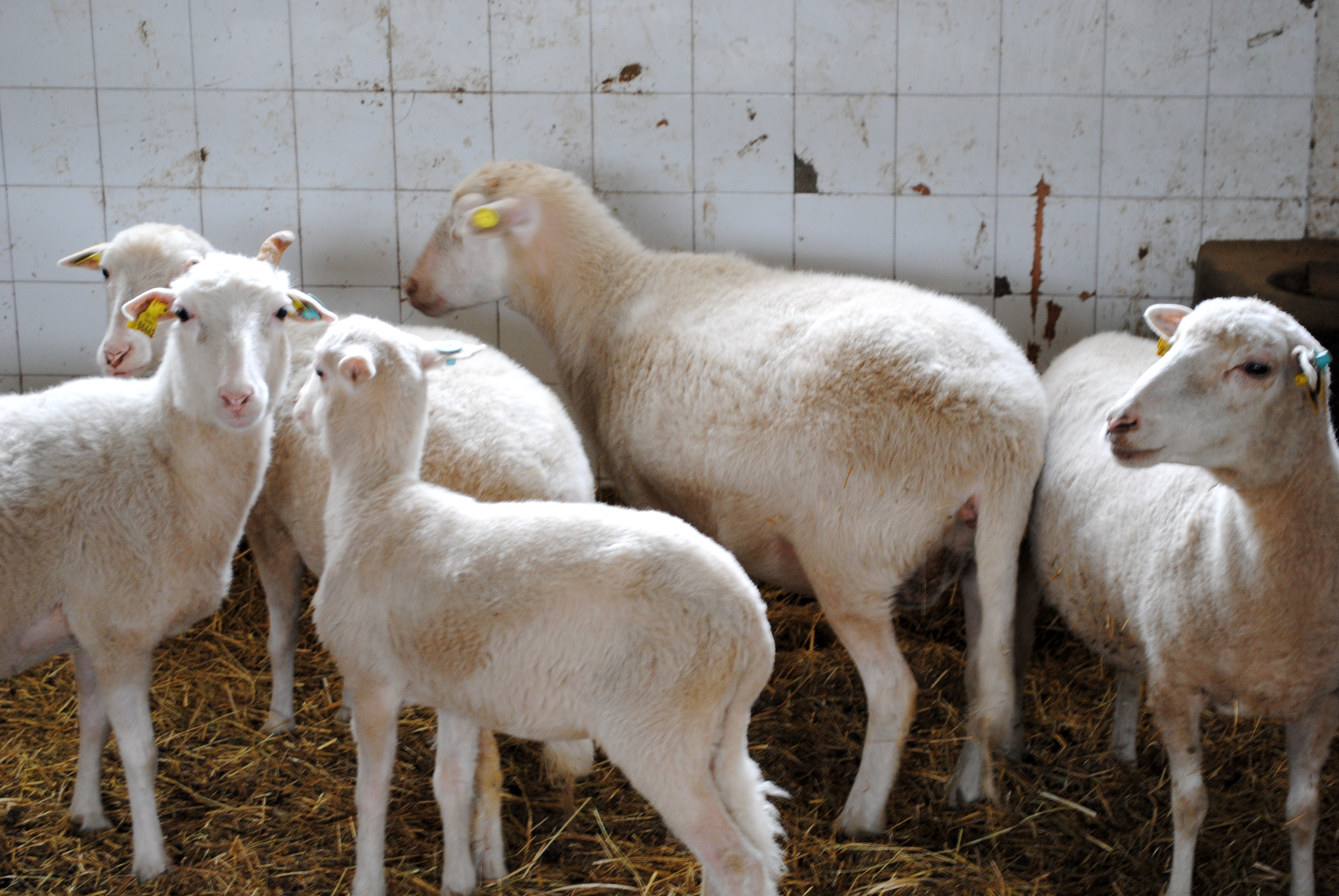
- Galician sheep in the Centro de Recursos Zooxenéticos de Galicia
- Country of origin: Spain

The Ovella galega (in English: Galician sheep) is a sheep breed of Galician origin. It belongs to the branch of producers of the inter fina, whose binomial name is the Ovis aries celtibericus. The number of animals of this breed in Galicia improved notably in the last years. In 2012 the total number of Galician sheep was 4,548 (3,862 females and 686 males) distributed in 110 farms.

== Geographical distribution ==
Although once found across Galicia, the breed now only exists in smaller, isolated communities throughout the region. The biggest concentration is located in Ourense, Spain, south of Lugo and the west of Pontevedra.

== Morphology ==
The Ovella galega is a sheep of relatively small stature, with a coat that is either all black or white in color. Males develop horns in the form of double-spirals, while in females, horns are generally diminutive if they exist at all.

There are two separate ecotypes, Mariñano or of the 'low areas', as well as Montaña, of the 'high areas'. The first ecotype generally features heavier sheep, at around 35-40 kilograms in females and 50-70 kilograms in males. The second, native to higher altitudes, tend to be smaller, around 20-35 kilograms for females and 35-45 kilograms for males.

== Uses ==
The main use for this breed of livestock is their meat and milk production.
