= Small-tail Han =

Breed of sheep

Small-tailed Han
- Country of origin: China
- Distribution: China
- Use: Meat

Traits
- Weight: Female: 35-45 kg
- Height: Male: 92 cm; Female: 77 cm
- Horn status: Both sexes horned

The Small-tailed Han is a breed of sheep native to the Shandong Province of China. It is known for its very high rates of reproduction and extremely high fecundity. Its high rates of reproduction have made it a growing part of China's livestock sector.

== Characteristics ==
The Small-tailed Han is a fairly small sheep, with ewes weighing 35–45 kg on average. Both sexes are horned, with the rams having large, spiral horns and the ewes possessing much smaller horns. They are a medium-wool breed.

Their most famous characteristic is their high fecundity, which reaches 229%, and their exceptionally high reproduction rates. The Small-tailed Han averages 3.44 lambs a year per ewe, with an average litter size of 2.29, and under ideal conditions, each ewe can produce 9 lambs every 2 years.

== Usage ==
The Small-tailed Han is primarily a meat sheep breed. It has become very popular since the late 1990s due to its high fecundity and reproduction rates. Because of this, it has become very popular for its genetic material; in 2003, its native province of Shandong sold over one-million Small-tail Han, mainly for breeding purposes. It is also a very adaptable breed to hilly, rolling pasture lands, meaning it is relatively versatile as to terrain.

However, it has some major downsides, as well. The biggest of these is the quality of its meat, which is considered to be very low, especially compared to the local Mongolian. Another concern is the breed's somewhat low dressing rate; Male lambs only have a bone-out dressing rate of 37% at 6 months old and 41% at 12 months old. However, there have been attempts to improve the Small-tailed Han through cross-breeding in recent years. Breeders have tried crossing it with imported breeds to improve the quality of its meat (especially the Polled Dorset), and it has been crossed with many local Chinese breeds as well.
