= Såne =

Breed of sheep

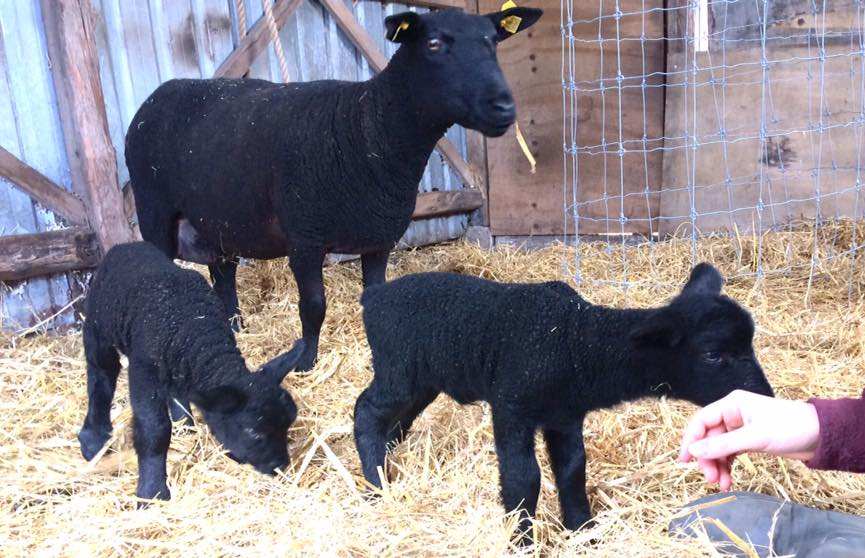
Såne ewe with lambs

The Såne is a breed of sheep of Danish origin. In the making of the breed, the purpose was to produce a hardy sheep that could produce a reasonable amount of meat being primarily grass fed, while it could be used for recreational purposes, landscaping and vegetation management. It is expected that eves in springtime may wean-off 2 lambs, in 6–8 months, with a slaughter weight of 20–28 kg (45–60 lb).

== The story of the Såne ==
The breeding began in 1971 in a village called Såne, at Esrum Lake, in the northern part of Zealand. To start with, Shropshire sheep were crossed with Karakul sheep. The Shropshire contributed with its size, plus the fact, that the Shropshire is known for not eating twigs and bark of trees and shrubs, unlike most other sheep breeds, a feature that is somewhat preserved in the Såne. The Karakul sheep contributed with its good health qualities, its moderation and coat color. Since then, the Norwegian Rygja sheep was added to increase stomach capacity, in order for it to better absorb large amounts of lean diet, and to a lesser extent to improve wool quality. The breed was officially approved in 1991. Since then the Suffolk sheep, to a lesser extent, has been used in an attempt to reduce and prevent inbreeding. However, not all breeders recognize animals with Suffolk blood as being pure-blooded.

== Characteristics ==
The head of the Såne sheep, is black and likewise the hoofs. The lambs are born with black fur, which, however, turns into a brown pelt when they grow up. In older animals, the fur usually begins to turn grayish. In addition, the breed is polled in both sexes.

Ram size: 90–120 kg (200–260 lb).

Eve size: 65–85 kg (145–185 lb).

Lamb birth size: approx. 4.5 kg (10 lb).
