= Rouge du Roussillon =

French breed of sheep

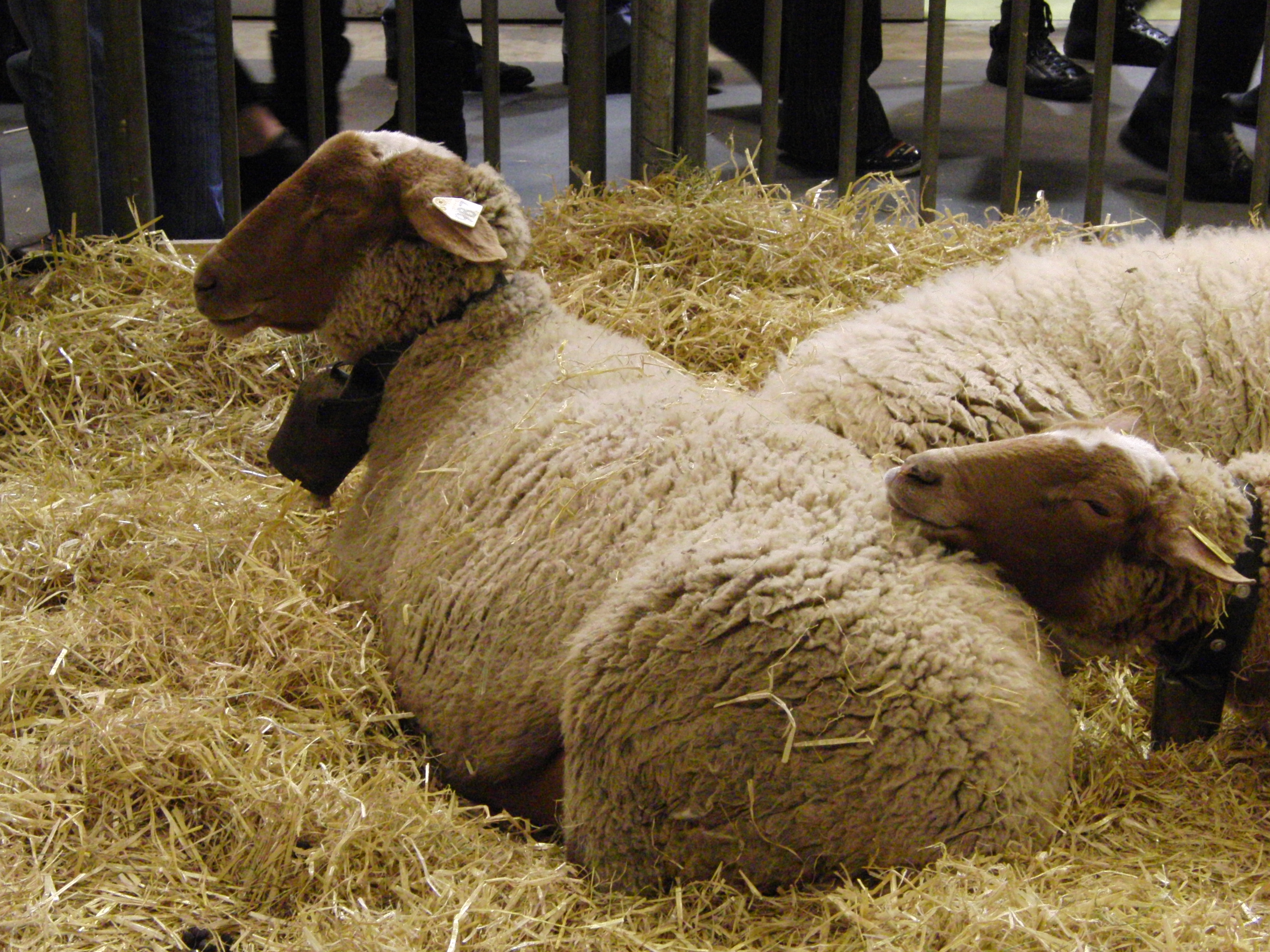

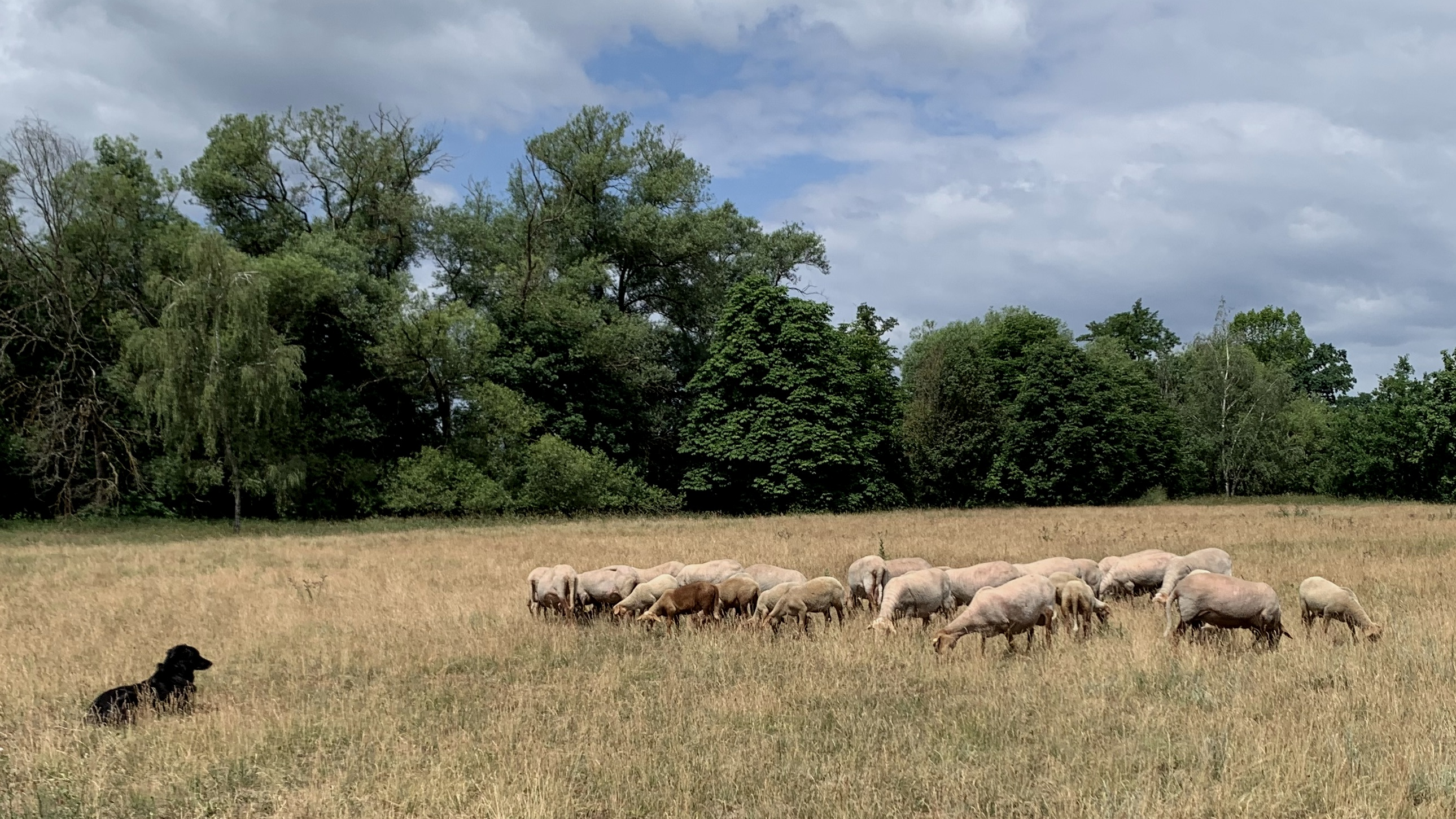
- Flock near Gebersdorf
- Conservation status: FAO (2007): not at risk; SJAS (2011): endangered; Mason (2016): seriously endangered; Porter (2020): nearly extinct; DAD-IS (2026): not at risk
- Other names: Roussillon Red; Berberina; Rouge du Littoral
- Country of origin: France
- Use: meat, wool

Traits
- Weight: Male: 75–100 kg; Female: 55–65 kg
- Height: Male: 75–90 cm; Female: 65–75 cm
- Wool color: white
- Face color: red
- Horn status: both sexes polled

The Rouge du Roussillon (Catalan: Roig del Rosselló) is an endangered French breed of sheep. It is distributed mainly in coastal areas of the former province of Roussillon in the Languedoc – now Aude and Pyrénées-Orientales in Occitanie – and for this reason may also be known as the Rouge du Littoral. It is raised principally for meat.

== History ==
It has been suggested that the Rouge du Roussillon may be of Algerian descent, and may have come to France in the eighteenth century, possibly via Spain.

== Characteristics ==
The Rouge du Roussillon is a medium-fine-woolled breed. The males typically weigh 75–100 kg and stand 75–90 cm tall, while ewes normally weigh around 55–65 kg and stand 65–75 cm tall. In terms of coloration, the Rouge du Roussillon typically has white wool with red colored head and legs. The sheep are extremely hardy, and are able to survive all year outside. They can also thrive at high temperatures, and can live in climates with temperatures of over 40 degrees Celsius. However, they also do well in colder climates with scarce food supplies.

== Use ==
The main use of the Rouge du Roussillon is meat. Traditionally, lamb meat has accounted for about 95% of income from raising Rouge du Roussillons. The lambs are usually sold when they are still fairly light, around 28–30 kg. Lambs sold when they are heavier are commonly considered to be too fatty and are not as desirable on the market. The rest of the income comes from wool sales They were historically milked, with the milk often being used for cheese production, but this is not common.

Rouge du Roussillon are not raised by transhumance, with herds mostly being sedentary. from mid-October to march the herds graze on residual plants left over from crop harvests. They are often raised alongside Lacaune sheep.

== Conservation status and efforts ==
The Rouge du Roussillon is endangered, largely due to a general decline in livestock raising in its native region. There is an estimated world population remaining of around 5,900 reproductive females. However, there has been considerable improvement in recent years in terms of its population numbers. A 1974 study estimated its population at only 750 ewes and 25 rams. In 1981, national protection actions were implemented to protect the breed, and from 1994-2001 a conservation program was launched in Grand Causses regional natural park in France.
