= Ruda sheep =

Breed of sheep

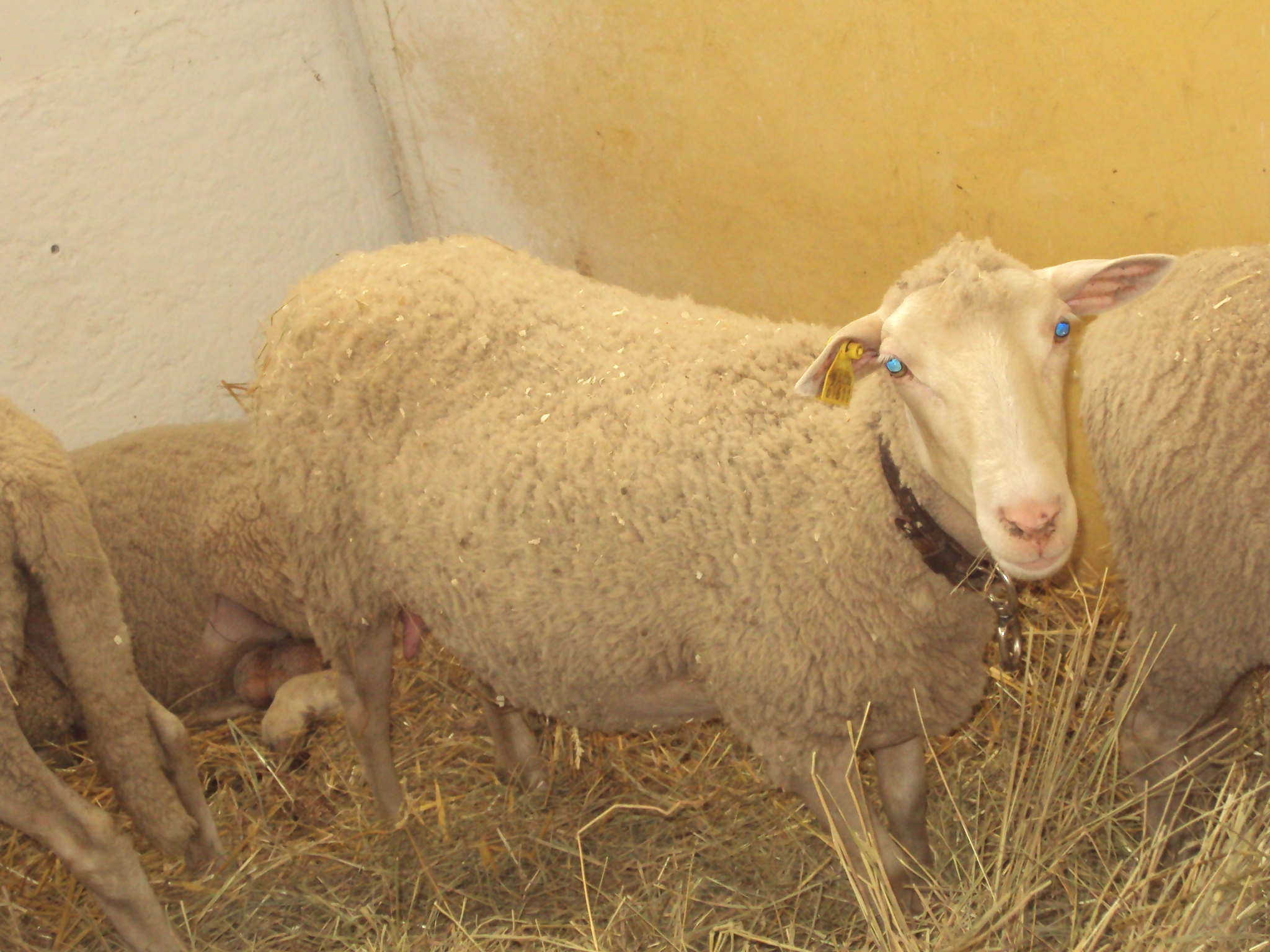
Ruda sheep in Dubrovnik, Croatia

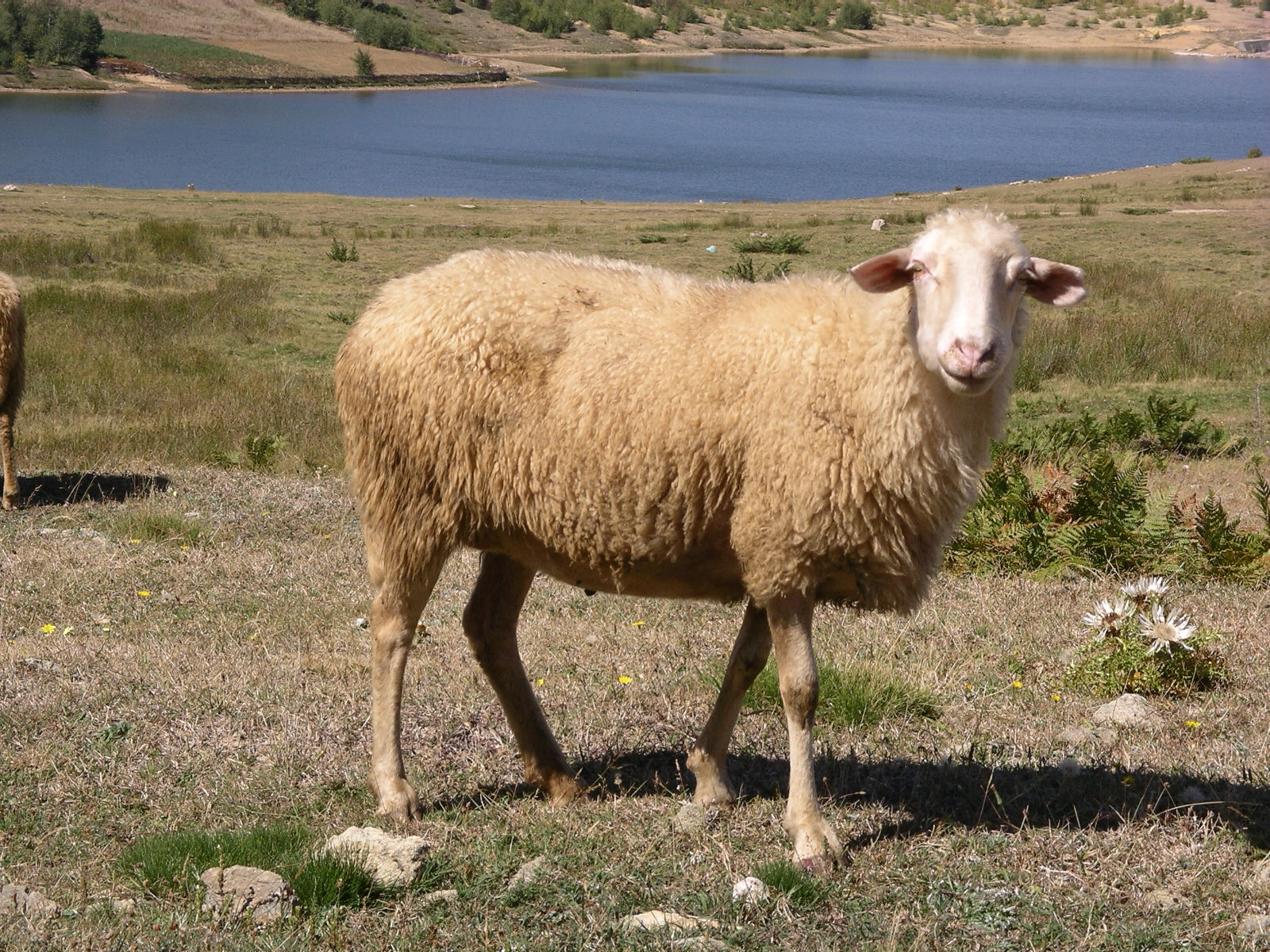
Ruda sheep in Albania

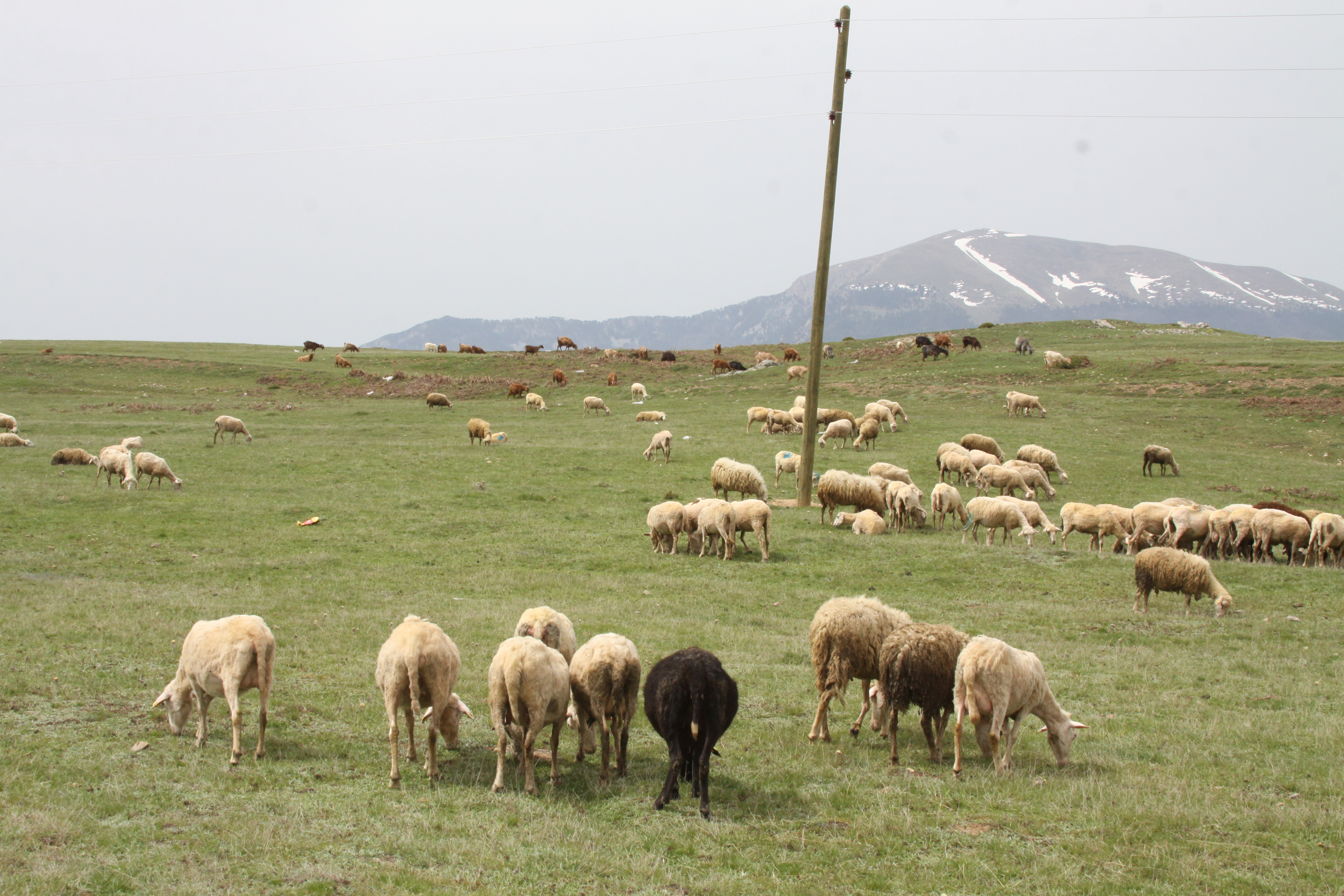
Ruda sheep in Albania

Ruda is a breed of sheep found mostly in Albania and Croatia. In 2009, Ruda sheep is the most endangered breed of sheep in the Republic of Croatia. The area in Croatia where Ruda is grown is exclusively the Dubrovnik coast and the neighbouring islands, with a smaller hinterland of Dubrovnik. The Ruda sheep originated from the Romanian Tsigai, a fine fleeced sheep in the Balkans. The Ruda may be related to the Romanian Tsigai. This breed is primarily raised for wool.

== Characteristics ==
The Ruda can have white or blond wool with a pink skin. This breed has a white head and has white spots on body and head. At the withers, mature ewes average 55 cm (21.6 inches) and rams 65 cm (25.6 inches). Mature ewes average 38 kg (83.7 lbs) and rams 48 kg (105.8 lbs). The Ruda is well adapted to low temperatures and mountain grazing.
