= Derbyshire Gritstone =

Breed of sheep

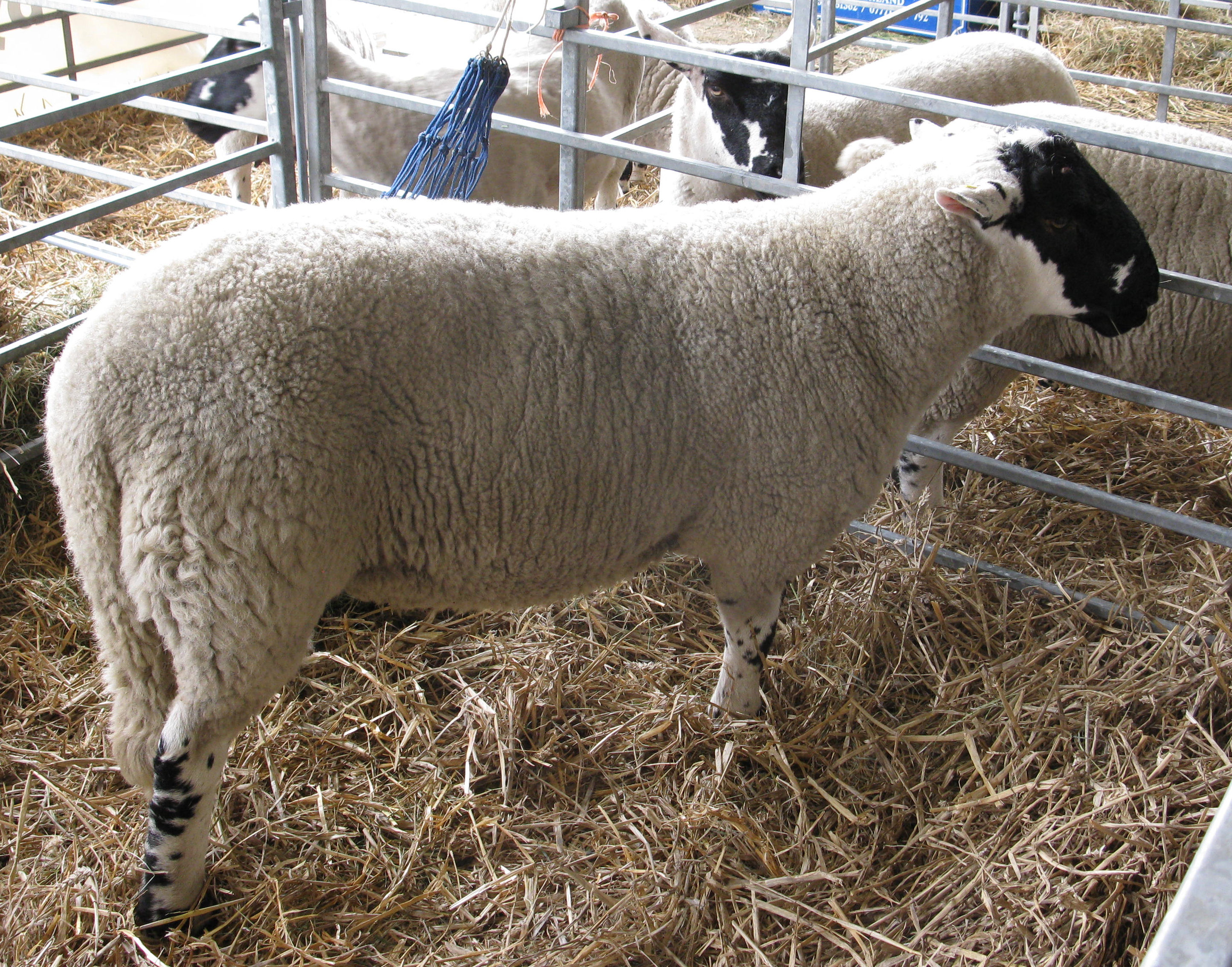
- Country of origin: United Kingdom
- Use: Meat

Traits
- Wool colour: White
- Face colour: Black
- Horn status: Hornless

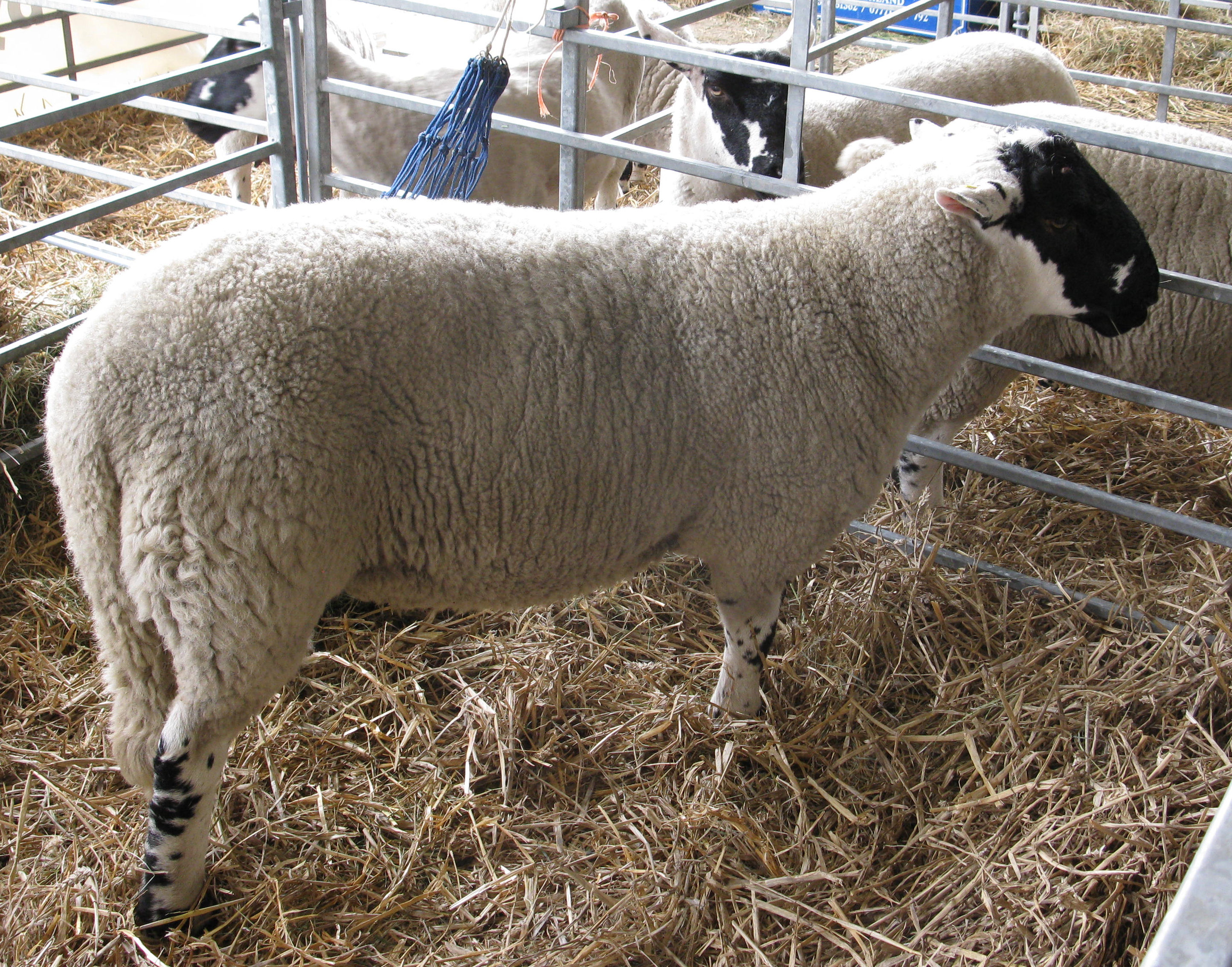
Derbyshire Gritstone sheep

The Derbyshire Gritstone is a breed of domestic sheep native to the United Kingdom. A hardy hill sheep, it is also one of the oldest British breeds. The Gritstone is generally found around Derbyshire, Cheshire, Yorkshire, and Lancashire. They are large, polled sheep with black and white faces. The Gritstone has a finer fleece than most hill breeds, but is still kept primarily for meat production.

== See also ==
- List of sheep breeds
