= Mehraban sheep =

Iranian breed of sheep

- Conservation status: FAO (2007): not at risk; DAD-IS (2026): not at risk
- Country of origin: Iran
- Distribution: Province of Hamadan

Traits
- Weight: 55 kg
- Height: 73 cm
- Wool colour: cream, grey or light brown
- Face colour: dark
- Horn status: naturally polled

The Mehraban is an Iranian breed of coarse-woolled fat-tailed sheep. It is distributed principally in the province of Hamadan, particularly in the north-west, in areas close to the provinces of Kurdistan and Zanjan. It is the most numerous sheep breed in that region.

== History ==
In 1990 there were about 1,150,00 of the sheep. In 2016 a total population of 3,000,000 was reported, while in 2023 the number was estimated to be between 300,000 and 400,000 head.

It is not an endangered breed – its conservation status was listed by the Food and Agriculture Organization of the United Nations as 'not at risk' in both 2007 and 2026.

== Characteristics ==
The Mehraban is coarse-woolled and fat-tailed. It is naturally polled (hornless). The average body weight is about 55 kg, and the average height at the withers about 73 cm.

The fleece may be cream-coloured, grey or light brown; the neck and face are dark.

It has some similarity to the Shal breed of Qazvin to the north-east of Hamadan.
