= Sakiz sheep =

Breed of sheep

The Sakiz is a carpet wool breed of sheep also kept for meat and milk production. They can be found in the region surrounding İzmir in Turkey.

The males are horned.
