= Taleshi sheep =

Breed of sheep

The Taleshi is a breed of domestic sheep from Iran, numbering some 400,000 animals in the north of the country, and distributed in the northern and western parts of Gilan Province in the mountains between Assalem, Khalkhal, Oshkourat, and Deilaman. This breed can also be found in some areas of Guilan-Zanjan border. Mean adult live weight in this breed is 35 kg (77 lbs) for rams and 31 kg (67 lbs) for ewes. The coat colour for this breed is yellowish-white to pure white, but brown patches are found on the head, face and at the bottom of the legs. This breed is valued mainly due to its small size, meat, and ability to live in mountainous areas.
