= Baluchi sheep =

Breed of sheep

Baluchi
- Other names: Baluchi dumda, Mengali, Taraki, Shinwari, Araghi, Farahani, Kermani, Khorasani, Khurasani, Naeini, Neini, Yazdi
- Country of origin: Pakistan; Iran; Afghanistan
- Type: Fat-tailed
- Use: Wool

Traits
- Weight: Female: 35 kg (77 lb)
- Wool color: Black, white
- Face color: Black

The Baluchi is a domesticated breed of sheep originating from southwest Pakistan, Baluchistan, eastern Iran and southern Afghanistan. It is a member of the fat-tailed breed. The Baluchi sheep is raised primarily for wool.

== Characteristics ==
This breed is well adapted to arid, subtropical areas in eastern Iran. They are good foragers.

The Baluchi displays black-and-white coloration with black marks on the head and legs. Ewes weigh 35 kg (77 lb) on average at maturity, lactate for approximately 120 to 130 days and provide 35 to 40 kg (77 to 88 lb) of milk during this period.

Body weight in lambs tends to decline from weaning age to 12 months of age due to no longer being fed by their mother and having to gather food for themselves.

Body weight differences between single and twin sheep are greater at birth and before weaning, but those differences tend to decrease after weaning. This is because twin sheep have to share their mother's milk.
