= Elliottdale =

Breed of sheep

The Eliottdale is a breed of domestic sheep originating from Tasmania. It is a carpet wool breed raised primarily for its wool. Due to the amount of wool grown by the Eliottdale, it needs to be shorn twice per year.

== Characteristics ==
The wool has a fibre diameter of 38 - 40 microns. At each shearing, the wool is approximately 120 to 200 mm (4.7 to 7.9 in) in length and weighs about 6.0 kg (13.2 lb). On average, rams weigh 70 kg (150 lb) and ewes weigh 58 kg (128 lb) at maturity. Rams can be horned or polled (hornless). Ewes are always polled. The breed is uni-colored and white.

== History ==
The Elliottdale is a dual purpose meat/wool sheep. When the flock was at the Elliott Research station (Tasmania) it was performance recorded, and breeding indices were developed by geneticists for both wool and meat. Though current breeders do not have the resources to continue this methodology, one has used traditional stud phenotypic selection, with an emphasis on confirmation, and carcass market suitability, as this is where the economics of the [sheep] enterprise is based at present. In the late 1980s the World Sheep Convention and Show was held in Launceston, Tasmania. It can be argued that the Elliottdale breed was the most successful breed in the carcass competitions held. This was mainly due to the timing of the show however, as most of the traditional meat breeds entered were overfat in the heavier classes and the Elliottdale lays down its fat more evenly and had better confirmation than other breeds in the lighter classes. Sheep entered came from only five breeders, and featured in the placings in most classes entered; some classes had up to 50 entries.

The Elliottdale breed was developed at the Elliott Research Station in Tasmania in the 1970s. In 1986 the breed was being commercialised and the Australian Carpet Wool Industry established. The effect of the Elliottdale gene (El) is similar to the Drysdale, Tukidale and Carpetmaster genes (N series genes) in the Romney breed, and is at a different locus on the chromozone. The El gene is semi-dominant (allowing homozygous lambs to be identified at birth), and is not associated with the gene for horns (ewes are always polled, rams may be horned or polled). The breed was developed in Australia from a mutant Romney ram rather than in New Zealand. The Elliottdale project was terminated in 1993, the Research Station becoming a Dairy research centre. Several of the sheep were purchased by a member of the Elliott Research Station team, Carl Terrey. He has continued with them as a stud to this time. There are only two Elliottdale flocks left, with a total of about 300 ewes so the breed is in serious risk of extinction. Carl's attention to the genetics has been fortunate. He still maintains 120 ewes which are kept in six families, about 20 ewes in each group.

== Current Standing of Breed ==
The breed is at serious risk of extinction with these low breeding numbers. Carl is concerned about the future of the breed and specifically his flock as he reaches an age he will need to retire.
