= Cine Capari =

Breed of sheep

The Cine Capari is a domesticated breed of sheep originating from Aydin Province in Turkey. In 1998, there were 300 Cine Capari and the population was decreasing. The Cine Capari is a fat-tail breed. The decline in population has been due to local farmers crossing this breed with the Chios with the purpose of creating a more prolific offspring.

== Characteristics ==
It has been reported that this breed is resistant to disease. This breed is white with occasional instances of light brown to dark black spots on the feet and belly. Ewes weigh 38 kg (84 lb) on average at maturity.
