= Dutch Spotted Sheep =

Breed of sheep

The Dutch Spotted Sheep, Nederlandse Bonte Schaap, is a breed of sheep which originates in the Netherlands.
