= Damani (name) =

Damani may refer to the following notable people

Given name

- Damani Nkosi, American rapper
- Damani Ralph (born 1980), Jamaican football forward
- Damani Sewell (born 1994), Jamaican cricketer

Surname

- Brijesh Damani (born 1982), Indian professional snooker player
- Harji Lavji Damani, Indian Gujarati-language poet, novelist and playwright
- Muhammad Usman Damani, 19th century Muslim scholar
- Olga Damani (born 1943), Greek actress
- Radhakishan Damani, Indian businessman
- Surajratan Fatehchand Damani (1912–1995), Indian politician
