= Uda sheep =

Breed of sheep

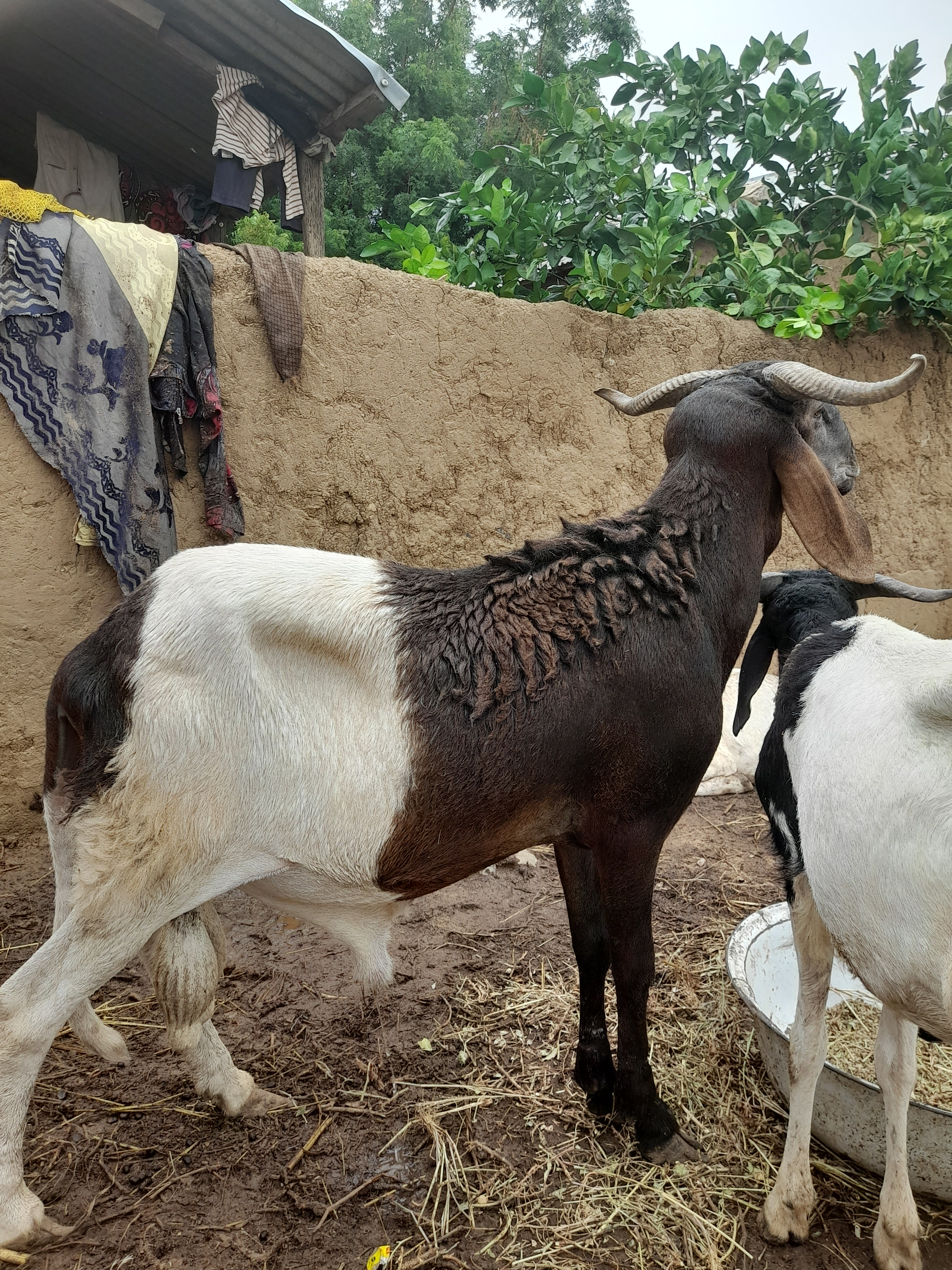
An Uda ram in Nigeria

Uda is a breed of African long-legged sheep common in Chad, Niger, northern Cameroon, and northern Nigeria. There are several varieties of Uda sheep. Typically the front half of Uda sheep is brown or black and the back half white.

== Characteristics ==
The Uda is generally raised for its meat. The ewes are typically hornless (polled), and the rams have horns.
