= Kooka =

Breed of sheep

The Kooka is a medium-sized thin tailed sheep used for mutton and wool. It is found mainly in the Tharparkar District of Sindh, and regionally in other parts of Sindh in Pakistan and India.

Kooka have a white body coat and a black face. They have a compact body and produce an average of one liter of milk each day. They also yield 1.7 kilograms of wool.
