= Coburger Fuchsschaf =

Breed of sheep

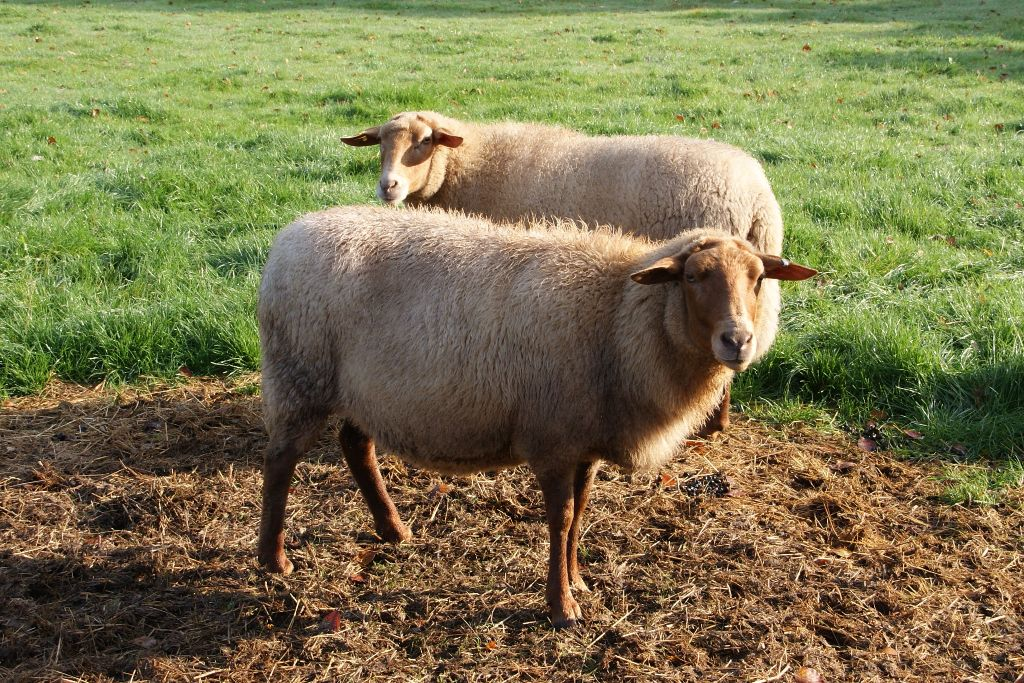
Two Coburger Fuchschaf in a field

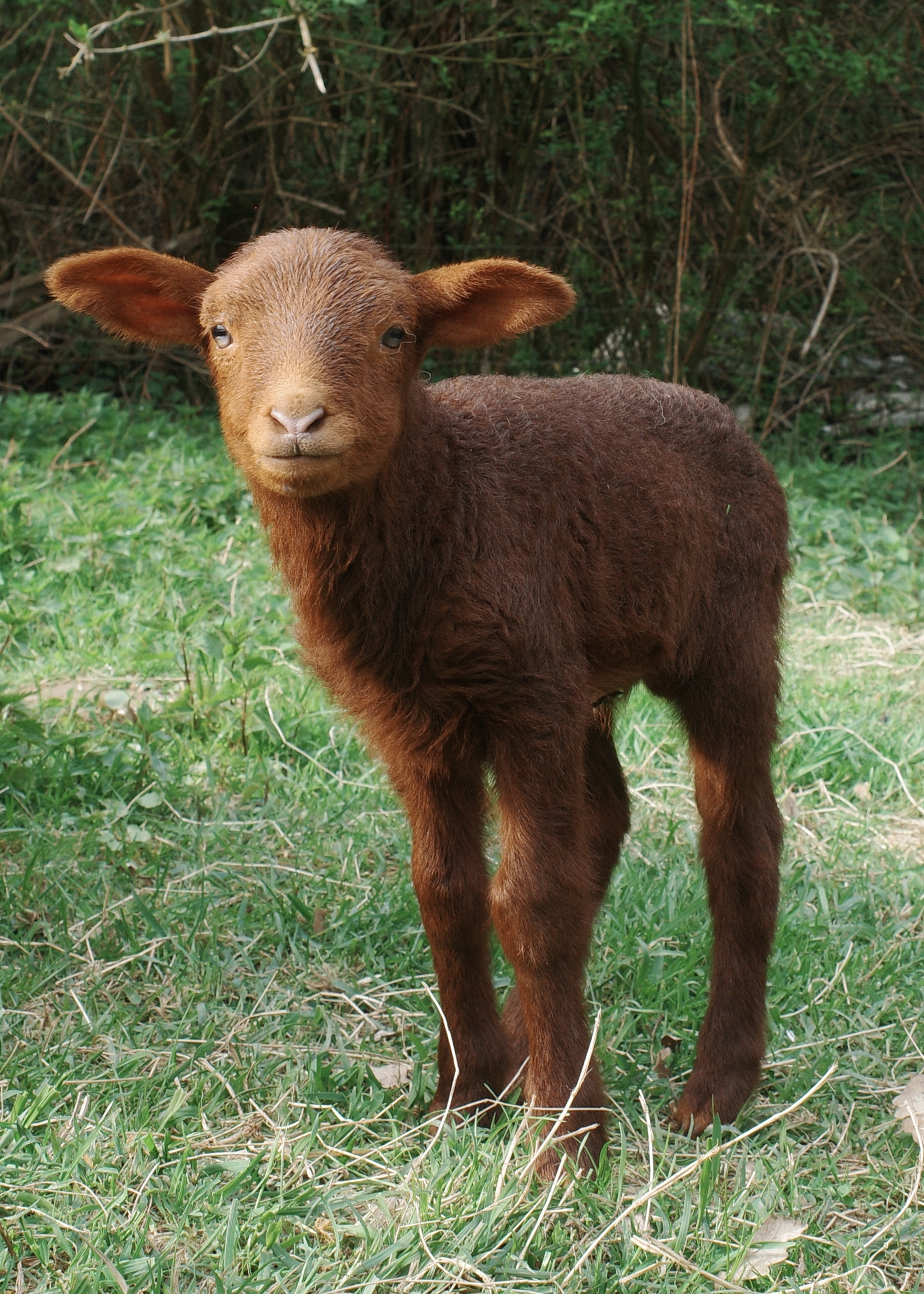
Coburg Fuchs lamb

The Coburger Fuchsschaf (also known as Coburg Fox Sheep) is a breed of domestic sheep from Germany. It is characterized by its reddish brown to golden color, which is most pronounced at birth, but remains at the head and the legs in the adult. Many animals also have a dorsal stripe.

From the 19th century to the early 20th century, this breed was abundant. However, after World War II, the Coburger Fuchsschaf was nearly extinct. Today, flocks of this breed are mostly employed for landscape preservation.

== History ==
After World War II, a German breeder publicized the positive traits of the Coburger Fuchsschaf. This renewed interest laid the foundation for the breed's continued existence. In the early 1980s, there were only two registered breeds of Coburger Fuchsschaf. By 1993, there were 34 breeders and over 1,200 breeding ewes and over 50 breeding rams. The breed was officially recognized in 1996.

== Breed standards ==
In 1982, the following breed standards were adopted.

- Rams - 80 to 100 kg (180 to 220 lb)
- Ewes - 60 to 75 kg (132 to 165 lb)
- Both sexes are to be polled (hornless)
- Legs are both golden or red-brown and free of wool
- Ears are broad and long
- Head is noble looking with a slight Roman nose profile.

== Characteristics ==
The Coburger Fuchsschaf is brown (unicolored) with a red head. Mature rams weigh about 80 kg (180 lb) and ewes 70 kg (150 lb). Measured at the withers, rams grow to 80 cm (31 in) and ewes to 70 cm (28 in). On average, ewes have 2 lambs per litter. Rams produce 4 to 5 kg (8.8 to 11.0 lb) and ewes produce 3 to 4 kg (6.6 to 8.8 lb) of wool yearly.
