= Najdi sheep =

Breed of sheep

Najdi
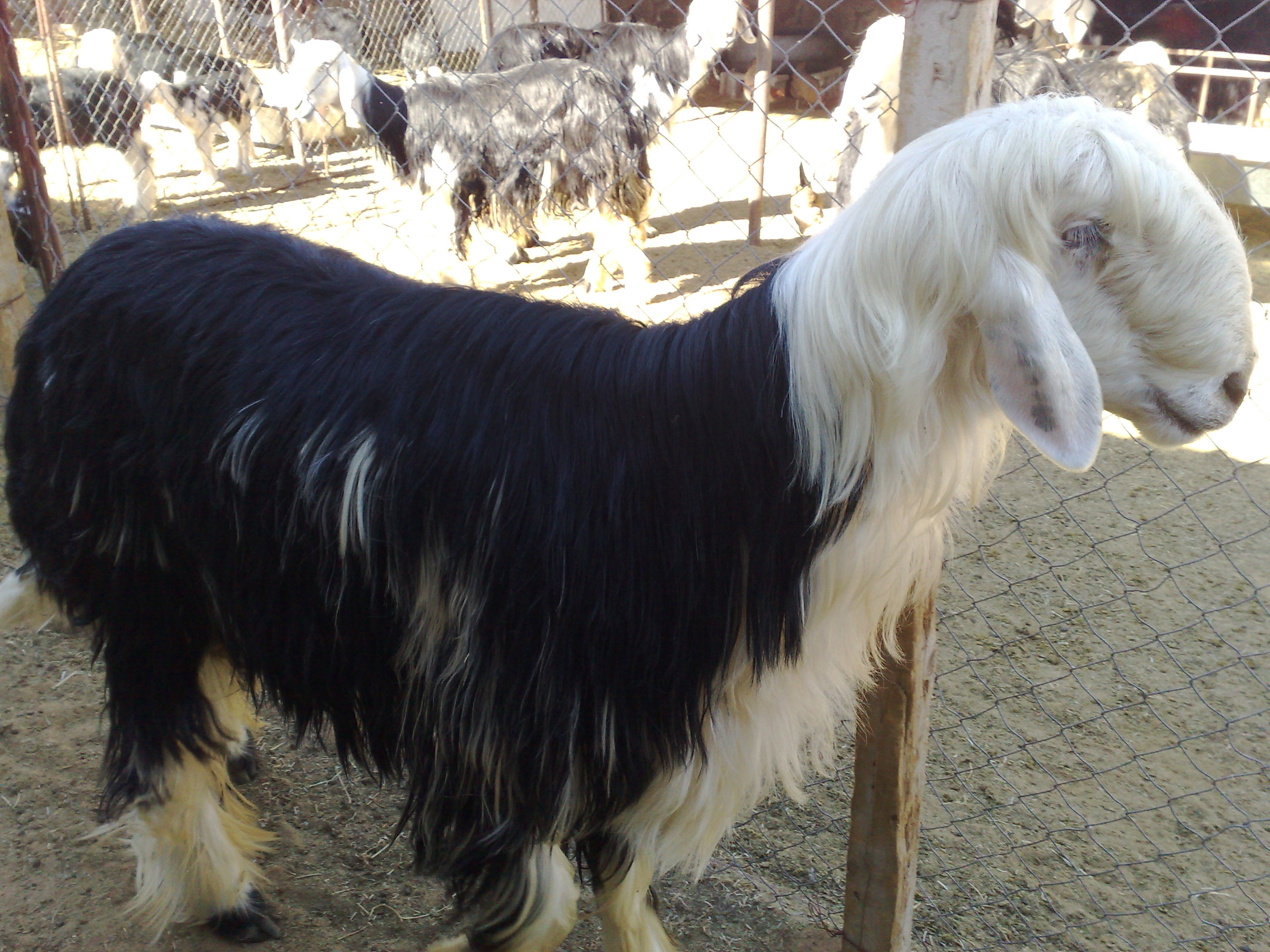
- Country of origin: Saudi Arabia

Traits
- Wool color: black
- Face color: White

The Najdi or Nejdi is a breed of domestic sheep primarily found in the Najd region of the Arabian Peninsula. Though it is primarily raised in Saudi Arabia, Najdi sheep are also present in Kuwait, Jordan, Iraq and Oman. They may also be found in many other locations, including Jeddah.

The Najdi has a distinctive appearance that has even been celebrated in Saudi "sheep beauty pageants" not unlike livestock shows and sales in the West. They are a very tall breed, averaging 76–86 centimeters (30–34 inches) in height at the withers. They have long, Roman nosed faces with drooping ears. Ewes are polled and rams may be either polled or have scurs. They are generally black with white faces and white on the legs and tail. Top Najdi ewes can sell for 20,000–30,000 Saudi riyals (US$5,300–8,000), while rams which can sire many more offspring can fetch hundreds of thousands.

Najdi are highly adapted to life in desert conditions, though it is less drought tolerant than some breeds, such as the Awassi. Though its meat may be consumed locally, it is especially valued for its milk, meat and long, straight wool.
