= Lohi sheep =

Breed of sheep

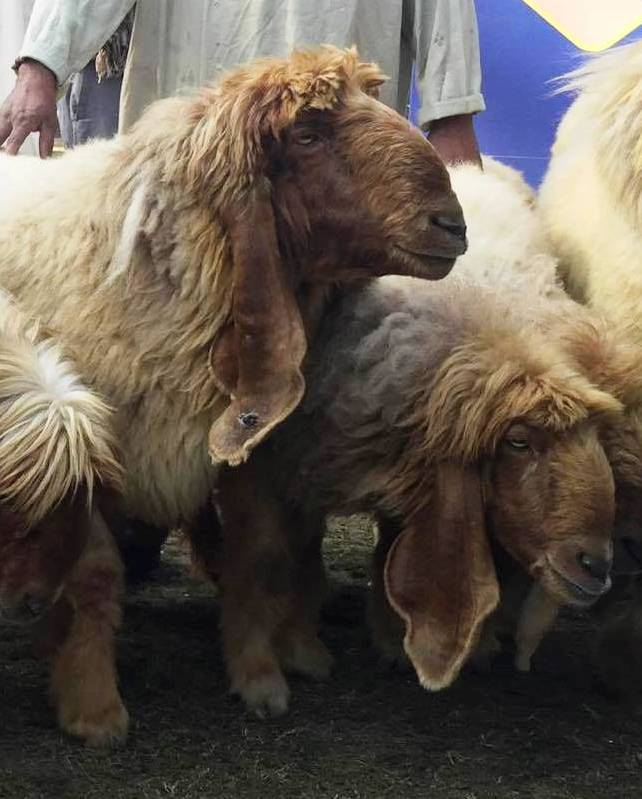

The Lohi or Parkanni sheep is found in Punjab, Pakistan and Punjab, Rajasthan and Haryana in India. It is used for its carpet quality wool and meat production. It contributes 40 percent of the total mutton production of Punjab. The sheep's body is white and the head is usually tan, black or brown.

Males weigh 65 kg (143 lb) and females 45 kg (99 lb) at maturity. The average annual wool clip is 3 kg (6 lb) of medium wool, which is approximately 40 micrometres in diameter. The average rate of milk production from Lohi ewes is 1.2 liters (0.3 gallons) per day.

The very large lop ears, which have apendages called Parkan on their surface, and prominent roman nose are the distinctive features of the breed. Both rams and ewes are polled.
