= Gansu Alpine Fine-wool =

Breed of sheep

Gamsu Alpine Fine-wool
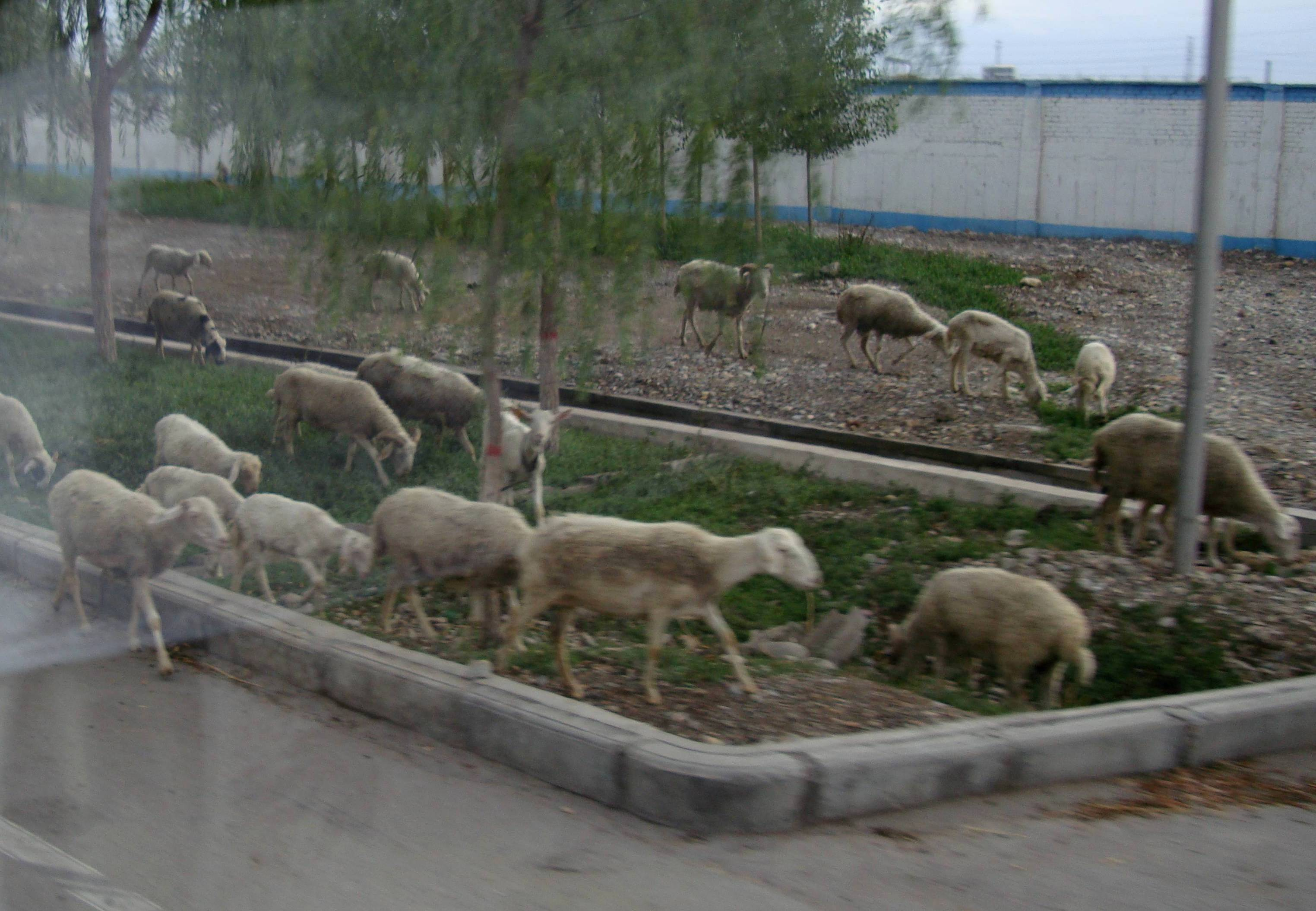
- Country of origin: China
- Use: Wool

Traits
- Skin color: White
- Wool color: White

Gansu Alpine Fine-wool is a breed of domesticated sheep from China. This breed was created by crossing Mongolian or Tibetan with Xinjiang Fine-wool and then with some fine-wool breeds from Russia. It is primarily raised for wool.

== Characteristics ==
This breed was specifically developed to readily adapt to the harsh climate and weather conditions native to the Huangchen District of Gansu Province.

Both sexes are unicolored and white. Rams are 78 cm tall at the withers, weigh 75 kg and have spiral shaped horns. Ewes are 65 cm at the withers, weigh 40 kg and have scurs or small horns. On average, ewes mature at 18 months while rams mature at 24 months. The average birthweight for rams is 4.2 kg while ewes is 4.0 kg. Ewes average 1.3 lambs per litter throughout her lifetime.
