= Bellary sheep =

Indian breed of sheep

The Bellary sheep is a medium-sized Indian breed of sheep native to the districts of Bellary and Davanagere and the adjoining areas of Haveri and Chitradurga districts of Karnataka.

== Characteristics ==
Bellary sheep are medium-sized with body color ranging from white through various combinations of white and black to complete black. Most of the rams have horns, while ewes are polled. Its ears are medium-sized, flat, and droop. It has a thin, short tail. Fleece is coarse, hairy and open. There is no wool on belly and legs. In a year, the Bellary grows up to 26 kg and gives birth to a single lamb. It is well adapted to the black soils and agro-climatic conditions of northern parts of Karnataka. Flocks of Bellary sheep migrate 150 to 300 kilometers to the southern parts of the state during December–August.
