= Serrai sheep =

Breed of sheep

Serrai
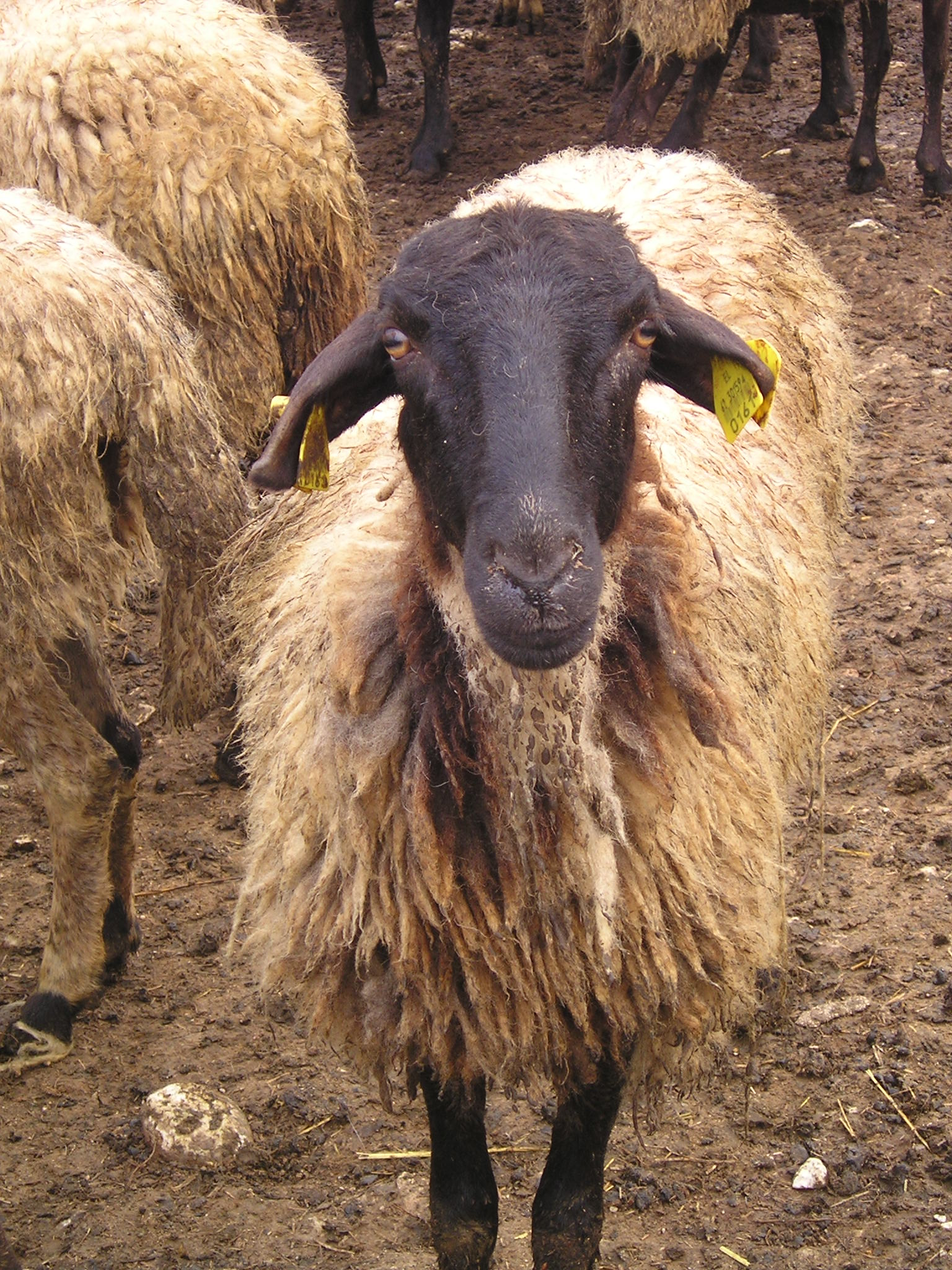
- Country of origin: Greece
- Distribution: Western Macedonia (Plains of Serres) and Thrace
- Use: Meat, milk

Traits
- Weight: Male: 78 kg; Female: 60 kg
- Height: Male: 68 cm; Female: 73 cm
- Wool color: White with entire black or black spots around head and legs
- Horn status: Males horned, females polled (hornless)

Notes
- Well adapted to humid areas with high temperatures

Serrai (Greek: Σερρών) is a breed of domesticated sheep from Serres, Greece. It is bred primarily for meat and milk.

== Characteristics ==
The Serrai has a Roman nose and thin tail. The rams have horns, weigh 78 kg at maturity are grow to 68 cm at the withers. Ewes have small horns 30% of the time, weigh 68 kg and grow to a height of 73 cm. On average, ewes produce 1.5 lambs per litter. They lactate 154 to 236 days (average 221 days) with an average yield of 0.7 kg of milk per day with a 7% fat content. The fiber has a 34 micron diameter.
