= Fuglestad =

Fuglestad is a Norwegian surname. Notable people with the surname include:

- Erik Fuglestad (born 1974), Norwegian footballer and coach
- Finn Fuglestad (born 1942), Norwegian historian
- Niklas Fuglestad (born 2006), Norwegian footballer
