= Van den Herik =

Van den Herik is a Dutch toponymic surname. Notable people with the surname include:

- Jaap van den Herik (born 1947), Dutch scientist and computer chess expert
- Jamai van den Herik (born 2003), Dutch professional darts player
- Jorien van den Herik (born 1943), Dutch businessman
- Rick Stuy van den Herik (born 1993), Dutch footballer
- Yolanda Hadid (née van den Herik, born 1964), Dutch-American television personality, former model, and interior designer
