= Arkhar-Merino =

Breed of sheep

- Country of origin: Kazakhstan

The Arkhar-Merino is a sheep breed. This breed was produced by crossbreeding between wild Arkhar rams and Precoce merino ewes in the Kurmektinski research station between 1934 and 1949 in Kazakhstan, then in the Soviet Union. This station is located between Kungei and Zailiiskii mountains in the Alma Ata region. The Arkhar-Merino has a firm and expanded skeleton. It is also bulky with long legs and broad chest. The average staple length is 6.24 to 8.08 cm in different regions of body. The average rate of wool fat is 11.95%. The average fiber diameter is 22.99 in ewes and 23.51 in ram. The greasy fleece weight is about 4.19 kg. In 1994 the Arkhar-Merino sheep was transformed to Arasbaran research station which is attached to the Research Center for Natural Resources and Domestic Animals of East Azerbaijan (This station is located in the Khodaafarin district).
