= Bardoka =

Breed of sheep

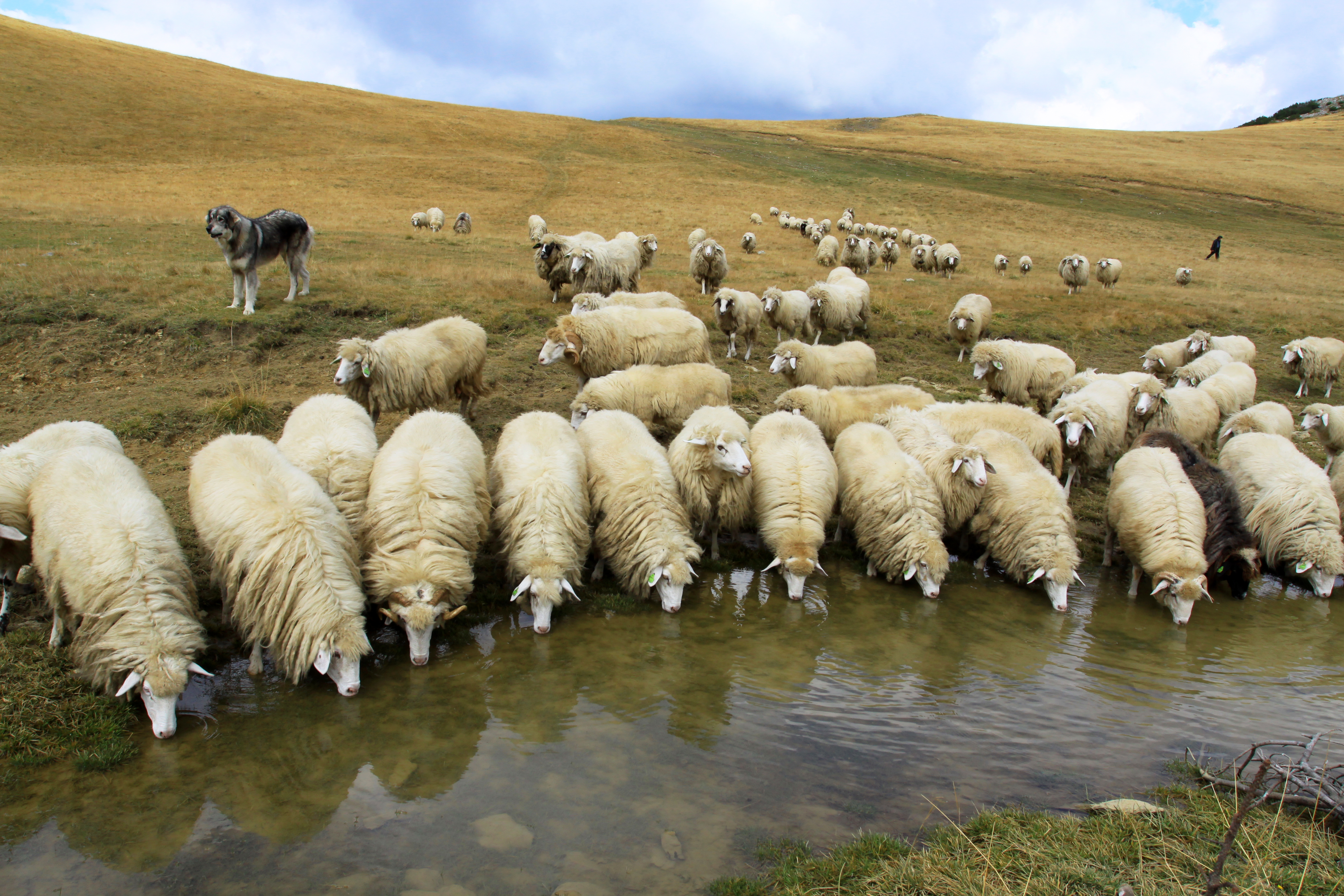
Bardhoka sheep drink from Lumbardh lake in Kosovo

The Bardoka (Albanian: Bardhoka) or White Metohian sheep (Albanian: Delja e bardhë e Dukagjinit - White Sheep of the Dukagjin) is a multi-purpose (milk, meat, wool and research) breed of domesticated sheep in Kosovo. It is a popular sheep in Kosovo and partially in Montenegro, Serbia and Albania. This breed appears to adaptable to all environmental conditions especially low temperatures. However, the Bardoka is sensitive to high humidity.

== Characteristics ==
The Bardoka displays white with pink skin. Both sexes are horned.

Mature rams weigh 65 kg (143 lb) and ewes 50 kg (110 lb) at maturity. At the withers, rams grow to 70 cm (28 in) and ewes 60 cm (24 in). Ewes lactate for approximately 180 days, provide 200 kg (440 lb) of milk with about 7.1% milk fat. At birth, rams weigh 3.5 kg (7.7 lb) and ewes weigh 3.2 kg (7.1 lb).
