= Bibrik =

Breed of sheep originating from Pakistan

The Bibrik is a fat-tailed, domesticated breed of sheep that is raised for its meat and found in Balochistan province of Pakistan.

== Characteristics ==
The Bibrik displays white with a black or brown head. The wool is coarse with a yield of 1.7 kg (3.7 lb) and an average diameter of 41.5 micrometres.

Both sexes are horned, with rams having curved horns. On average, rams weigh 37 kg (82 lb) and ewes weigh 31 kg (68 lb). At maturity, rams grow to 64 cm (25 in) and ewes 48 cm (19 in) at the withers. At birth, rams weigh 2.8 kg (6.2 lb) and ewes 2.4 kg (5.3 lb). Normally, ewes give birth to only one lamb at a time, lactate for about 100 days and provide 40 kg (88 lb) of milk with 6.5% fat during that period.
