= Karayaka =

Breed of sheep

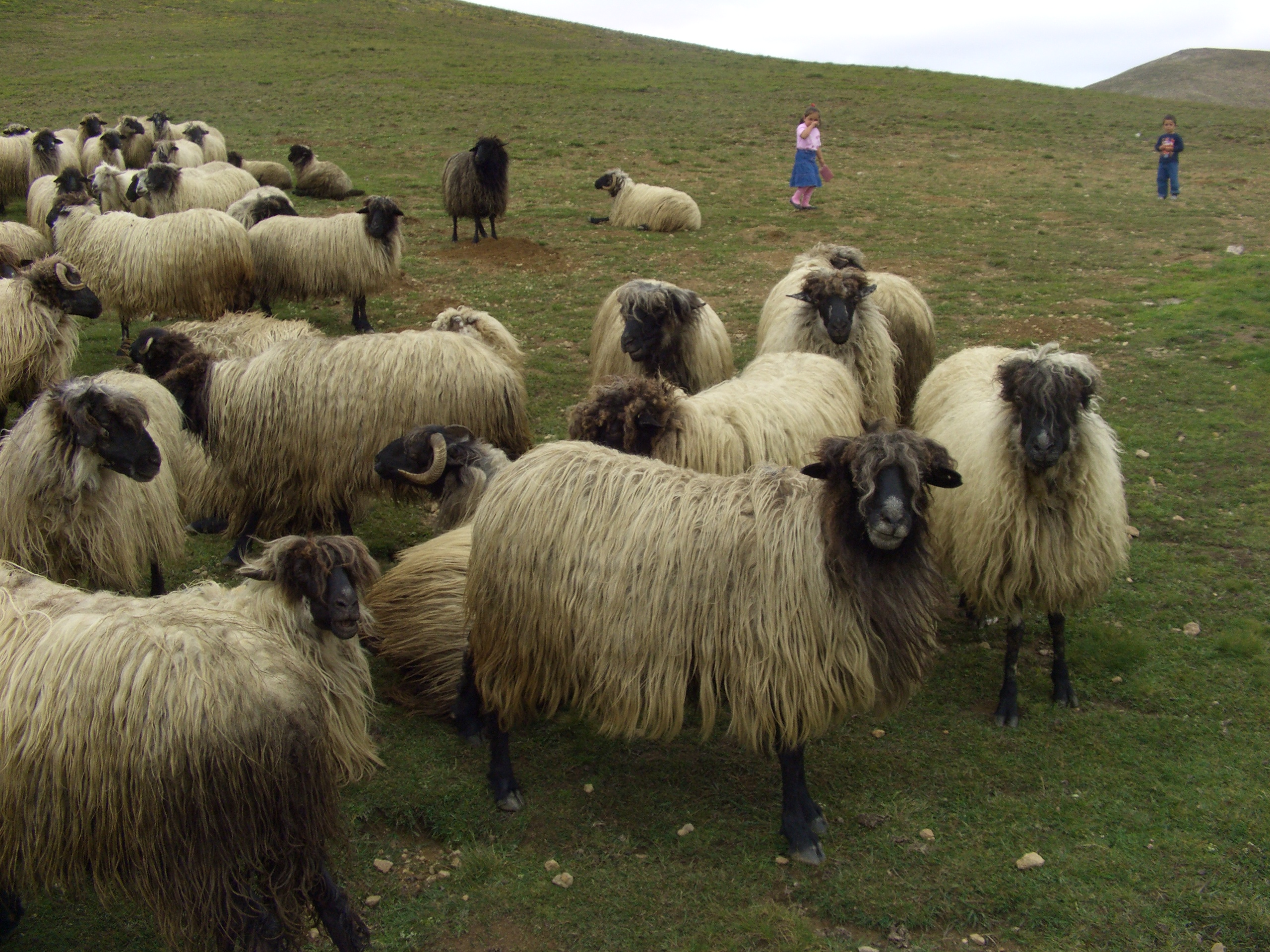
A Karayaka flock

The Karayaka (Black Neck) is a breed of domestic sheep from Turkey. It is a dual purpose breed producing meat and milk. The wool is used in carpets. The Karayaka is classified as a long thin-tailed breed.

== Characteristics ==
Usually, the Karayaka is white with black eyes, head and legs. Infrequently, brown or black animals are seen. Most of the time, rams are horned and ewes are polled (hornless).

On average, ewes are 61.1 cm (24.1 in) at the withers and 67.4 cm (26.5 in) long. Also, ewes weigh 35 to 40 kg (77 to 88 lb) and produce 40 to 45 kg (88 to 99 lb) of milk in a 130- to 140-day lactation period. In a study, it was found that ewes produce about 1.8 to 2.4 kg (4.0 to 5.3 lb) of fleece with a 21 to 28 cm (8.3 to 11.0 in) staple length and 39 to 43 micron diameter.
