= Kajli =

Breed of sheep

Kajla is a breed of sheep, native to Punjab, Pakistan. It is mainly bred in Sargodha and nearby cities such as Gujranwala, Lahore, Faisalabad, Toba Tek Singh and Jhang, apart from being found in some parts of India. The breed is bred primarily for its wool, meat and milk. This breed can grow significantly large and bulky at a young age.

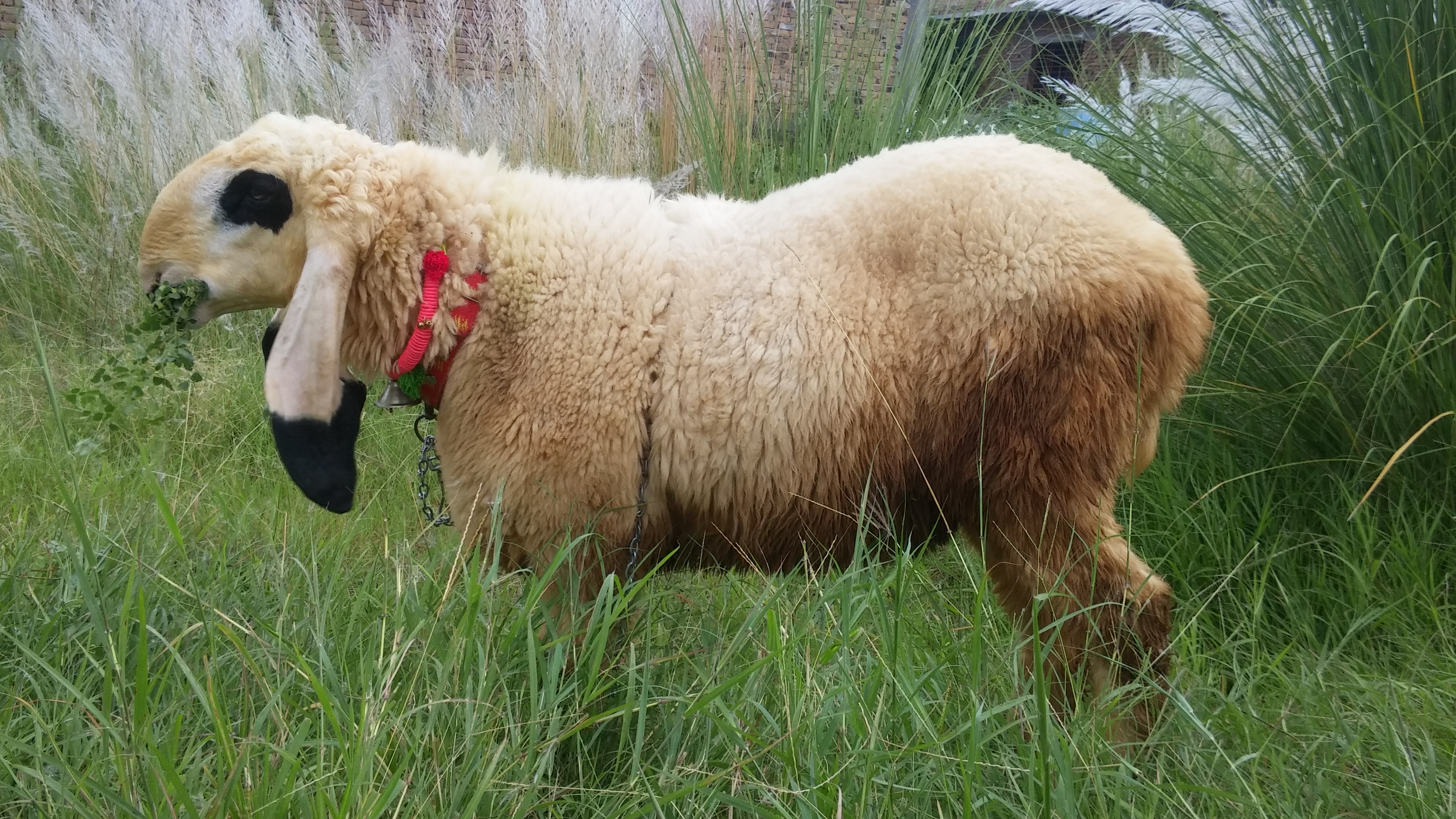
A purebred Kajla lamb in Pakistan.
