= Aussiedown =

Breed of sheep

- Country of origin: Australia
- Distribution: New South Wales, Victoria
- Use: Meat

Traits
- Weight: Male: 140 kg (310 lb); Female: 110 kg (240 lb)
- Skin color: White
- Wool color: White
- Face color: White

Aussiedown sheep are an Australian breed of sheep that was developed in the early 1990s using Southdown and Texel genetics. The resulting progeny have a maximum of 75% Southdown and Texel ancestry. They are mainly used as prime lamb sires, by crossing them over purebred or crossbred ewes.

Aussiedown sheep are easy care, clean faced, plain bodied sheep that produce a white, downs type wool with a fibre diameter of 28 to 33 microns, with a staple length of 60 to 90 mm and a fleece weight of about 3–5 kg (6.6–11.0 lb). Stud rams may weigh up to 140 kg (310 lb) under good conditions and ewes about 87 kg (192 lb). High lambing percentages are common.

This breed is mostly found in the south-east areas of Australia, in New South Wales and Victoria.
