= Ladoum sheep =

Sheep breed

The Ladoum sheep is breed of domestic sheep found in Senegal. A cross between the Mauritanian and Malian breeds of sheep, Ladoum sheep is an important commodity in Senegal and even viewed as a prized pet. It has a tall stature, prominent muzzles, and curved horns and it can reach four feet in height. The Ladoum sheep has become an important part of culture in Senegal. Prized for its aesthetics, beauty pageants are held for the sheep and it even features in billboard advertisements.
