= German Whiteheaded Mutton =

Breed of sheep

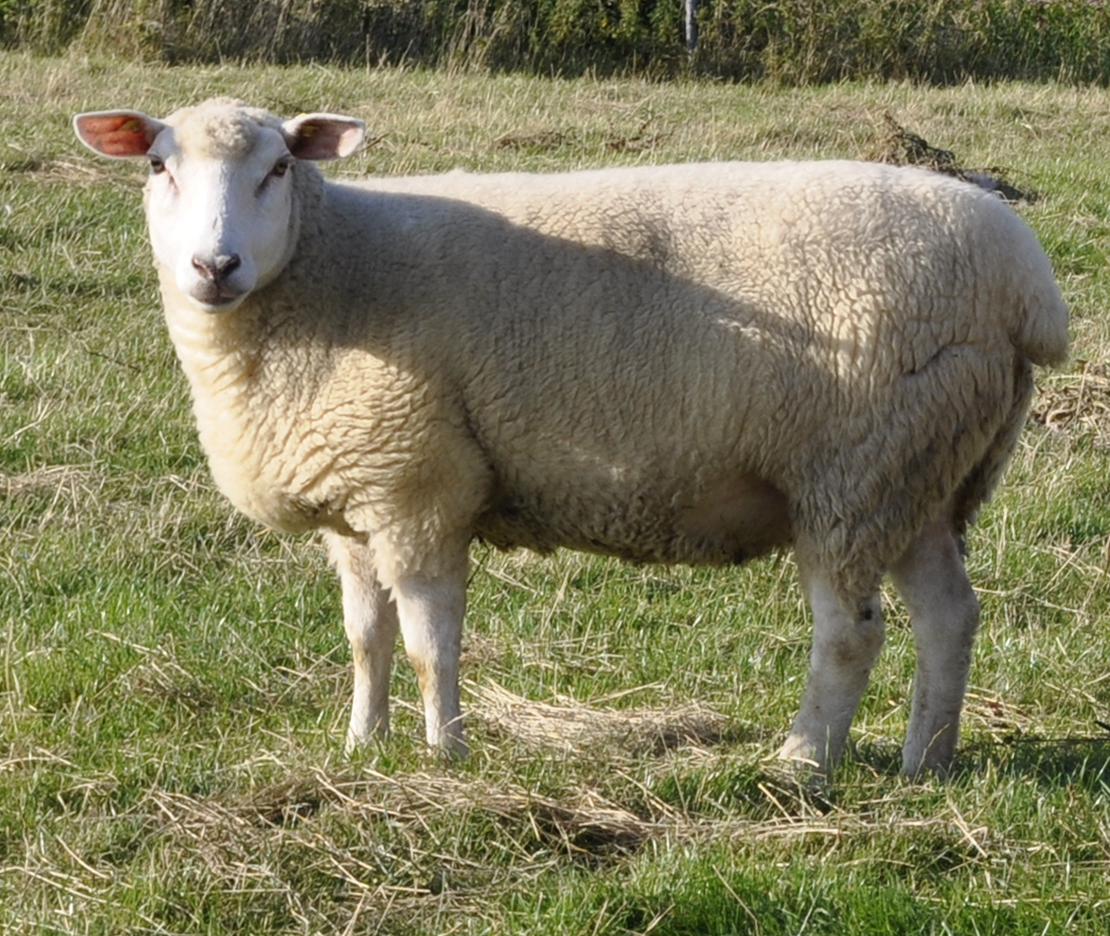
- A German Whiteheaded Mutton
- Conservation status: Endangered
- Other names: Weißköpfiges Fleischschaf, Oldenburg White Head, Whiteheaded German, Whiteheaded Marsh, Whiteheaded Oldenburg
- Country of origin: Germany
- Distribution: Germany, Denmark, very small population in New Zealand
- Use: Meat, wool

Traits
- Weight: Male: 110-130 kg; Female: 70-80 kg
- Wool color: White
- Horn status: Both sexes polled

The German Whiteheaded Mutton (German: Weißköpfiges Fleischschaf) is a breed of sheep developed to live along the North Sea coast of Germany. It is a dual-use breed used for both its fine wool and meat production. They often graze along the North Sea dikes in Northern Europe.

== Origin ==
As per its name, the German Whitehead Mutton originated in Germany. It was bred in the mid-20th century by crossing the British breeds English Leicester, Cotswold, Hampshire, and Oxford with the local Wilstermarschscha marsh sheep. The breed has been further improved by cross-breeding it with other varieties, primarily the Dutch Texel starting in 1966 and the French Berrichon du Cher in the 1970s.

== Characteristics ==
The Whiteheaded Mutton is a breed designed to live in the cold, wet regions around the North Sea marshes. Consequently, the sheep was bred for hardiness and durability to cope with the rough weather in the region. Rams typically weigh about 110-130 kg and ewes normally weigh around 70-80 kg. The Whiteheaded Mutton possesses a very long, rough fleece, with average fleece weight being about 7.4 kg for rams and 5.5 kg for ewes, and a fiber diameter of 37-41 microns. Its fleece is also known for its very good crimp, which is exceptionally high considering the roughness of the Whiteheaded Mutton's wool. The Whiteheaded Mutton also possesses very meaty hindquarters and thick loin and rack meats, making it good for meat production as well. Another important characteristic of the Whiteheaded Mutton is its high fecundity. The Whiteheaded Mutton typically reproduces at a rate of 1.5-1.8 lambs per ewe per year.

== Usage ==
The German Whiteheaded Mutton is a dual-use sheep and is used for both the production of wool and meat. In Germany, the German Whitehead Mutton is commonly grazed along the grassy areas of the North Sea dikes, where they both are fattened off the grass and help to solidify the dikes by trampling and compacting the earth they graze on. In the winter, the sheep are moved behind the dikes and often are grazed on harvested cropland.

The German Whiteheaded Mutton has also been utilized for its genetics. In the 1980s a population was exported to New Zealand from Denmark to improve the genetics of local sheep flocks (today the breed is very rare in New Zealand, with only several hundred remaining). The German Whiteheaded Mutton was also the basis for the development of the British Oldenburg breed.

== Conservation status ==
The German Whiteheaded Mutton is listed as a class III endangered livestock breed according to GEH. There is an estimated world population of roughly 182 rams and 1,734 ewes remaining.
