= Guligas =

Breed of domestic sheep originating in Central Asia

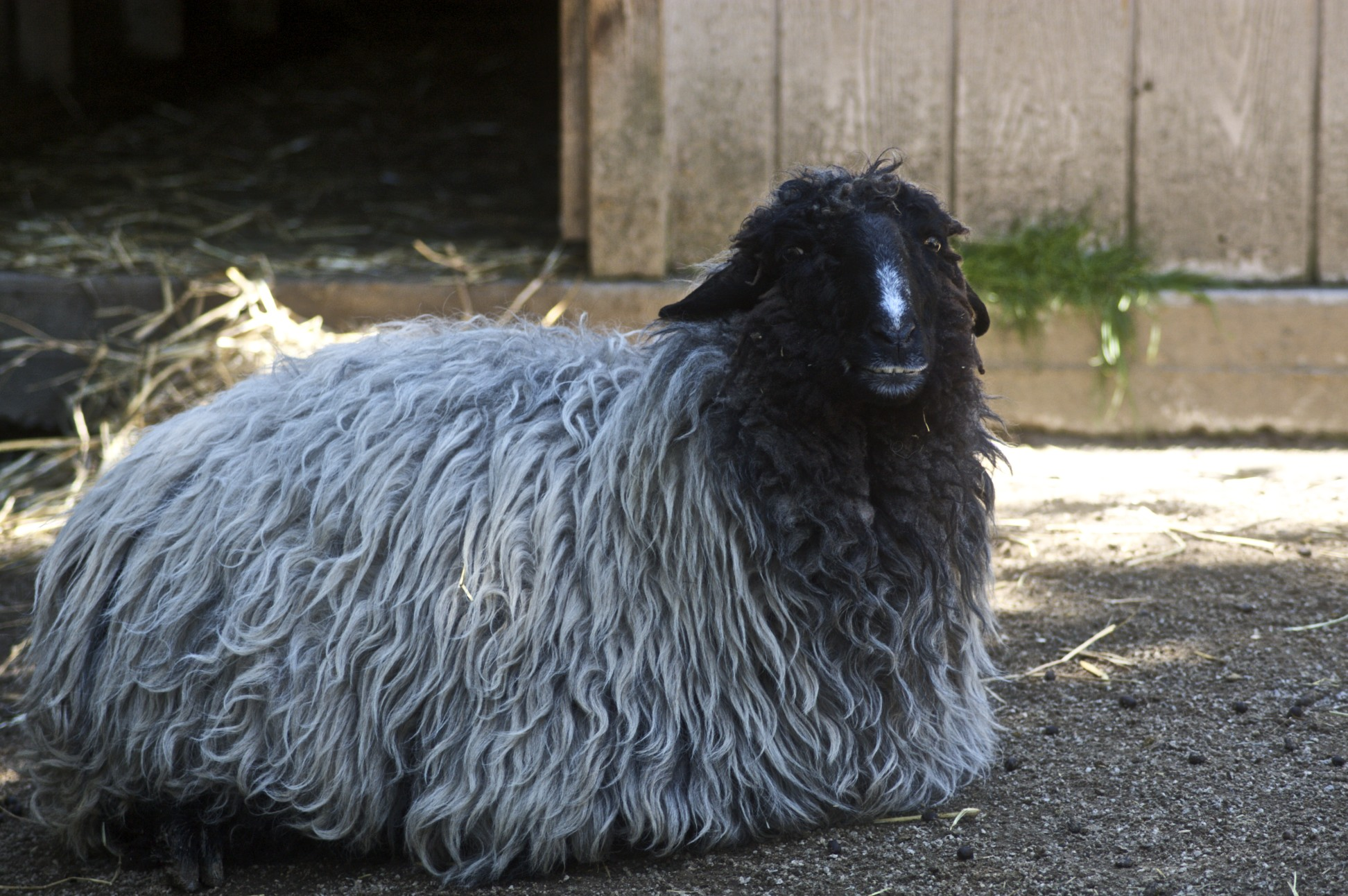
Karakul sheep in Akron Zoo

Guligas is a breed of domestic fat-tailed sheep from Uzbekistan, a variety of the Karakul sheep. It is a pink roan color, sometimes described as lilac or grey-brown.
