= Damani sheep =

Breed of sheep

The Damani is a thin-tail, meat and wool breed of sheep which is found in the Dera Ismail Khan district and part of Bannu district in Khyber Pakhtunkhwa province of Pakistan.

== Characteristics ==
They are small to medium with a white body coat with a black or tan head and camel colored legs. The wool yield is 1.5 kg (3.3 lb) with coarse fiber (44 micrometres diameter). They have small ears. The udder and teats are well developed.

At maturity, rams grow to 61 cm (24 in) at the withers and weigh 32 kg (71 lb) while ewes grow to 53 cm (21 in) at the withers and weigh 27 kg (60 lb). On average and at birth, rams weigh 2.7 kg (6.0 lb) and ewes weigh 2.5 kg (5.5 lb). Average litter size is one. Average milk production during lactation is 80 kg (180 lb) over about 120 days with 5.8% fat. The number of members of the Damani has decreased from over one million in 1986 to approximately 600,000 in 2006.
