= Altay sheep =

Breed of sheep

Altay
- Country of origin: China
- Use: Meat

Traits
- Weight: Male: 82 kg (180 lb); Female: 68 kg (150 lb)
- Height: Male: 76 cm (30 in); Female: 72 cm (28 in)
- Horn status: Both sexes are horned

The Altay is a breed of domesticated sheep originating in the dry, cold mountain basins of China. This breed belongs to the fat-rumped carpet-wool type of sheep and the Kazakh group. Although the Altay grows wool, it is raised primarily for meat.

== Characteristics ==
The tail (or rump) weighs about 15 lb (6.8 kg). At maturity, the rams average 180 lb (82 kg) and the ewes 150 lb (68 kg). The Altay's lambing percentage is approximately 103%. The Kazakh group of sheep average 2.5 lb (1.1 kg) to 3.5 lb (1.6 kg) of wool per shearing. The average height at the withers of mature rams is 76 cm (30 in) and 72 cm (28 in) for ewes. Both sexes are horned. Average birth weight for rams is 4.5 kg (9.9 lb) and ewes 4.25 kg (9.4 lb).
