= Tsigai =

Breed of sheep

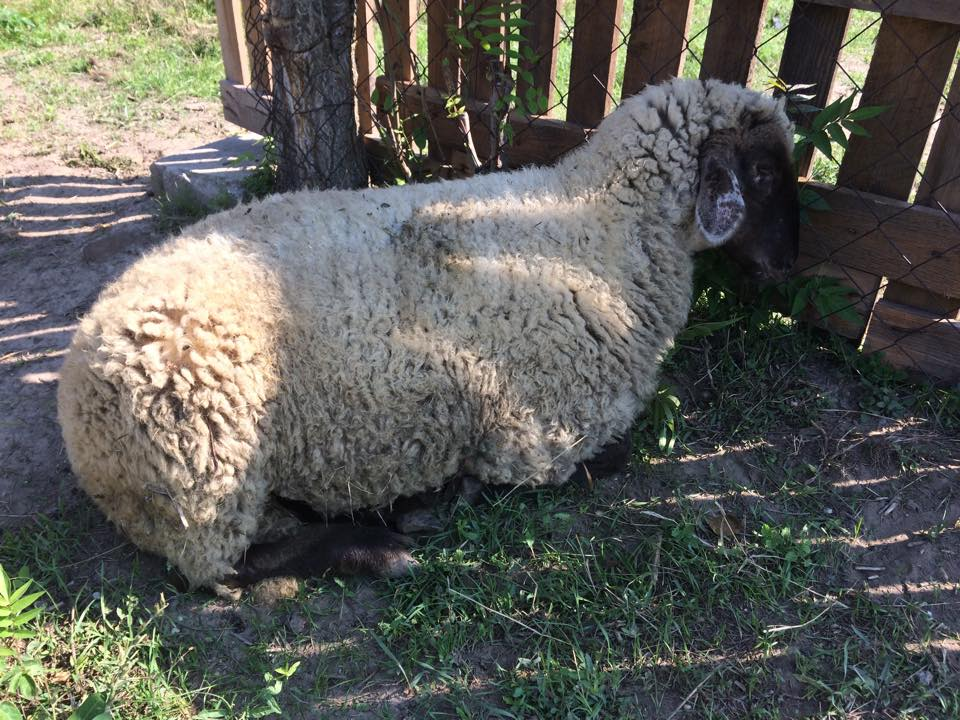
Tsigai

Tsigai is a Romanian sheep breed.

== History ==
The Țigaie breed is part of the domestic sheep species (Ovis aries). The breed originates from sheep domesticated in the area of the eastern part of the Black Sea and through migration over time, through the north and south of the sea reaching the south of Moldova and the area of Dobrogea, where it began to form as a local breed, being one of the first breeds of sheep from Europe. By some authors it is considered an old race, formed early, not being a primitive race, but still unimproved according to modern breeding science, based on population genetics.

From the place of formation in southern Moldavia and Dobrogea, Țigaia also spread to Transylvania by the Mocans who practiced transhumance, being acclimatized in the mountain area of the Curbura Carpathians (Săcele-Covasna, Brețcu, Bran, Teșila, Vrancea, Plăiesi, LipTranshumance Romanian shepherds have dispersed the Șigaie race in Southern Ukraine, Russia, Bulgaria, Slovakia and the Czech Republic, in Vojvodina and the Pannonian Plain since time immemorial. In Turkey, the Tiger breed was imported from Romania and is currently known as Kivircic.Starting after the 18th century, the development of the textile industry of linings, thick fabrics for military uniforms, blankets and hats, in the city of Brașov and in neighboring towns such as Prejmer, Covasna also increased the demand for semi-fine wool, characteristic of the țigaie sheep, contributing to the formation of a uniform population of țigaie in these areas.).

== Properties ==
Generally the sheep has long dangling ears, white wool with some black thread, and its legs and head are black or dark brown. Its skin is dark and the body parts which are covered with keratin are dark grey. The male Tsigai can sometimes grow horns.

The Tsigai only lambs once a year, and rarely bears twins.

There are two different breeds of Tsigai:

=== "Old" or native Tsigai ===
The "old" breed is bred for its milk, meat and wool, which is used in textile industry. The male Tsigai's shoulder height is 75 to 80 centimetres (30 to 31 in) and the female's is 60 to 65 centimetres (24 to 26 in). The Tsigai is milked for 5–6 months, and this breed can yield 40 to 60 litres of milk. The lambs are sandy grey in colour. There are around 10,000 females and 50 males in Hungary, both in the Körös-Maros National Park and in private breeders' farms.

=== Domestic Tsigai ===
Since 1999 the domestic Tsigai has been recorded as a separate breed to the "old" Tsigai, and has been a protected breed since 2008.The domestic breed is bred for its milk. The milk of the Tisgai is used in cheesemaking. Its body size is much bigger than the "old" Tsigai; the male's shoulder height is 90 to 100 centimetres (35 to 39 in) and the female's is 75 to 80 centimetres (30 to 31 in). In the milking period it yields 110 to 120 liters (29 to 32 U.S. gal) of milk. Lambs are born with a black fleece.

== Sources ==
- Történelmi állatfajták enciklopédiája (encyclopedia book) by János Tőzsér, Sándor Bedő. Released by Mezőgazda kiadó, Budapest, 2003
