= Polled Dorset =

American breed of sheep

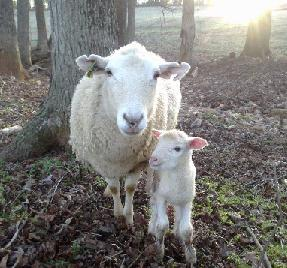
- Ewe and lamb at the North Carolina State University Small Ruminant Unit
- Country of origin: USA

The Polled Dorset is an American breed of domestic sheep. It is a polled (hornless) variant of the British Dorset Horn. It was developed at the North Carolina State University Small Ruminant Unit in the 1950s after a genetic mutation led to the birth of a polled ram. After some years of breeding work, a true-breeding polled strain was established.

It is an all-white sheep of medium size, prolific and able to breed out of season. The carcass is muscular with good conformation, and the fleece is free from dark fiber. The number of Polled Dorsets registered in the United States has grown to exceed the number of Horned Dorsets.

== History ==
In 1949, four hornless lambs were sired by a Horned Dorset on a farm at North Carolina State University in Raleigh. Over the next five years, as part of their normal breeding program, those four ewes and the other ewes on the farm were bred to a Horned Dorset ram. Eventually, a ewe gave birth to twin rams: one was normally horned, but the other, NCSU 402, was polled.

From 1956 the Polled Dorset was registered by the Continental Dorset Club (started in 1898), in the same flock book as the Dorset Horn. Livestock scientists, the late Dr. Lemuel Goode and the late Sam Buchanan, are credited with identifying and developing the hornless sheep. The offspring of NCSU 402 were bought by other breeders, and within twenty years seventy percent of all registered Dorsets were polled. The success of the Polled Dorset has made it considered to be the second most popular sheep breed in the United States. A polled strain of Dorsets was also developed in Australia in the 1900s; however, these were not as a result of a genetic mutation but resulted from the introduction of Corriedale and Ryeland blood into the Dorset Horn.

== Conformation ==
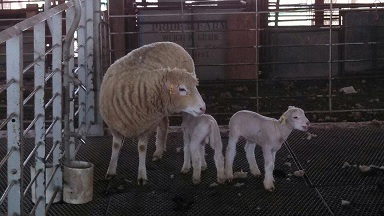
A Polled Dorset ewe and her lambs at a North Carolina State University farm

The Polled Dorset is a medium-sized sheep, long-lived and prolific, and a heavy milker. It produces hardy lambs with moderate growth and maturity that yield heavily muscled carcasses. Their fleece is very white, strong, close, free from dark fiber and extends down the legs. When shorn, fleece averages between 5 and 9 pounds (2.3 and 4.1 kg) in ewes, and fifty to seventy percent of their fleece can be used. The staple length ranges from 2.5 to 4 inches (6.4 to 10.2 cm) with a numeric count of 46's-58's. The fiber diameter ranges from 27.0 to 33.0 microns. At maturity, ewes weigh between 150 and 200 pounds (68 and 91 kg), some weighing more in show condition. Mature rams range in weight from 225 to 275 pounds (102 to 125 kg). Dorsets are noted for their ability to be bred more than once per year and are commonly used in crossbreeding to produce females for out-of-season breeding. They are one of the few breeds that have this characteristic. Multiple births are common, and they work well in commercial operations, including programs where rams are specifically used to sire lambs for slaughter. These rams are known as terminal sires since their genetics are more suitable for slaughter than breeding purposes.

Since the breed first became commercial, it has spread to Canada and become a major contributor in the commercial lamb industry. The breed adapts well to confinement and is readily used in accelerated crossbreeding programs. Polled Dorsets thrive under grass-based and feedlot conditions and are more suitable on small farms that are intensely managed.
