= Dalesbred =

Breed of sheep

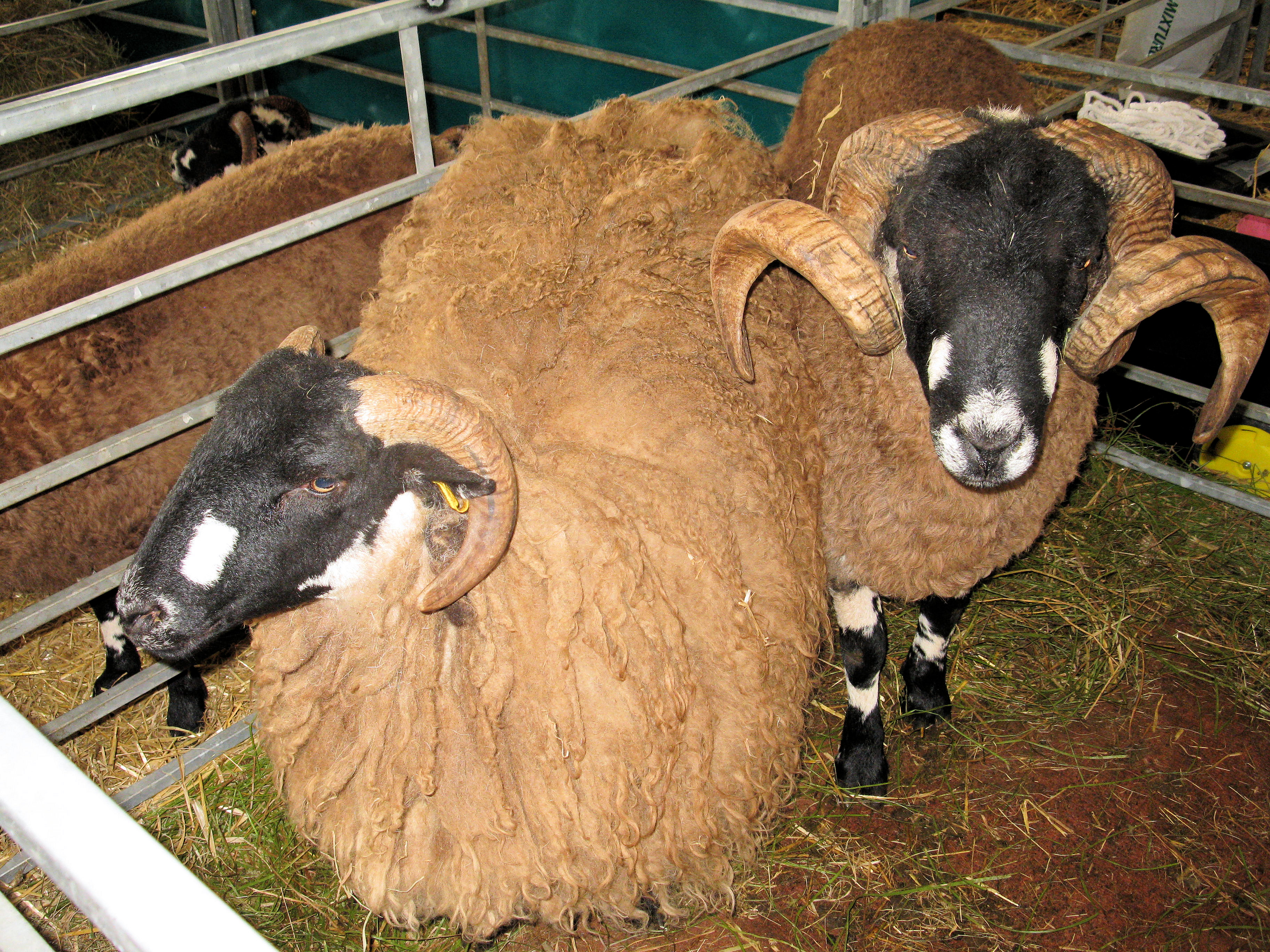
- Conservation status: At risk
- Country of origin: England
- Distribution: Lancashire, Yorkshire
- Type: Upland
- Use: Meat, wool, crossbreeding

Traits
- Weight: Male: 55-75kg (121-165lb); Female: 45-60kg (99-132lb)
- Wool color: White
- Face color: Black
- Horn status: Horned

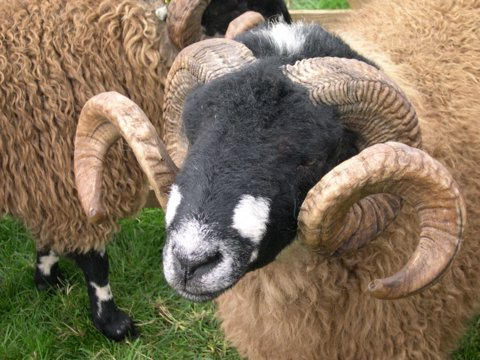
Dalesbreds have a distinctive white spot on either side of the muzzle, and the rams have large curling horns.

The Dalesbred is a breed of domestic sheep originating in England. Derived from the Swaledale and Scottish Blackface breeds, the Dalesbred is a northern hill breed distributed in the Yorkshire Dales and into Lancashire. The Dalesbred is genetically distinct from the other northern hill breeds, the Herdwick and Rough Fell.

Very similar in appearance to its parent breeds, both rams and ewes have distinctive horns and a white carpet-quality fleece. Scurs are absent in the breed. It can be best distinguished by having a white spot on each side of its black face, with the end of the muzzle becoming grey. This breed is primarily used for meat and wool production. The legs are free of wool and are mottled black and white. Dalesbred ewes weigh 45 to 60 kg (99 to 132 lb) and rams 55 to 75 kg (121 to 165 lb).

Dalesbred are a hardy breed capable of surviving the harsh conditions of upland terrain. They are generally bred for several generations in this environment, then ewes are sold to lowland farmers for cross breeding to produce mules. Ewes are often crossed with Teeswater rams to produce the Masham which is one of the most famous of British crossbreeds.

Due to the location and small extent of its distribution, this breed was threatened during the foot-and-mouth disease epidemic in 2001. It is still considered at risk due to its distribution.

Ewes have strong mothering characteristics.
