= Bluefaced Leicester =

British breed of sheep

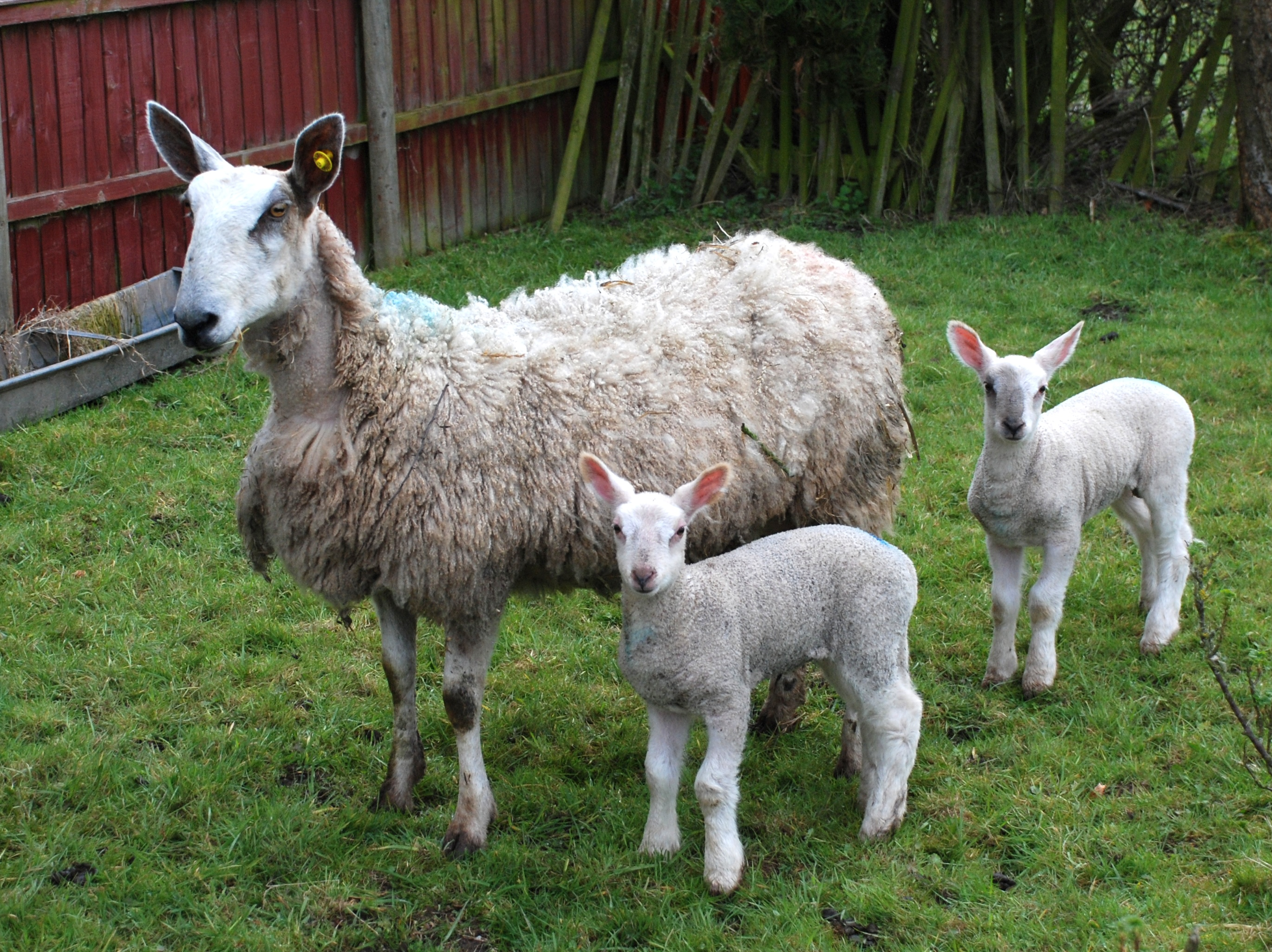
- Ewe with lambs

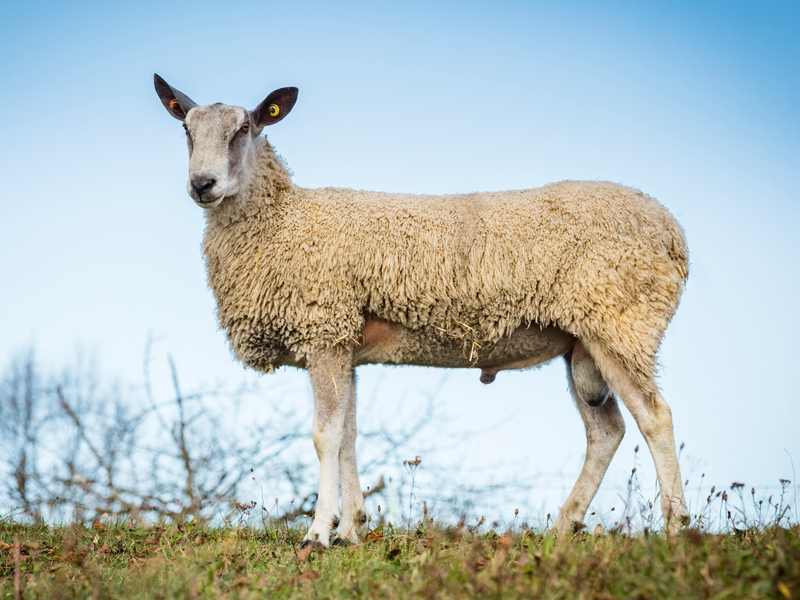
- A Ram
- Conservation status: FAO (2007): not at risk; DAD-IS (2025): not at risk
- Other names: Hexham Leicester
- Country of origin: United Kingdom
- Distribution: Canada; Holland; Ireland; United States
- Standard: Bluefaced Leicester Sheep Breeders Association
- Use: crossing sire

Traits
- Weight: Male: average 115 kg (250 lb); Female: average 80 kg (180 lb)
- Height: Male: average 90 cm (35 in); Female: average 85 cm (33 in)
- Skin colour: blue-grey
- Wool colour: white
- Face colour: blue
- Horn status: naturally polled

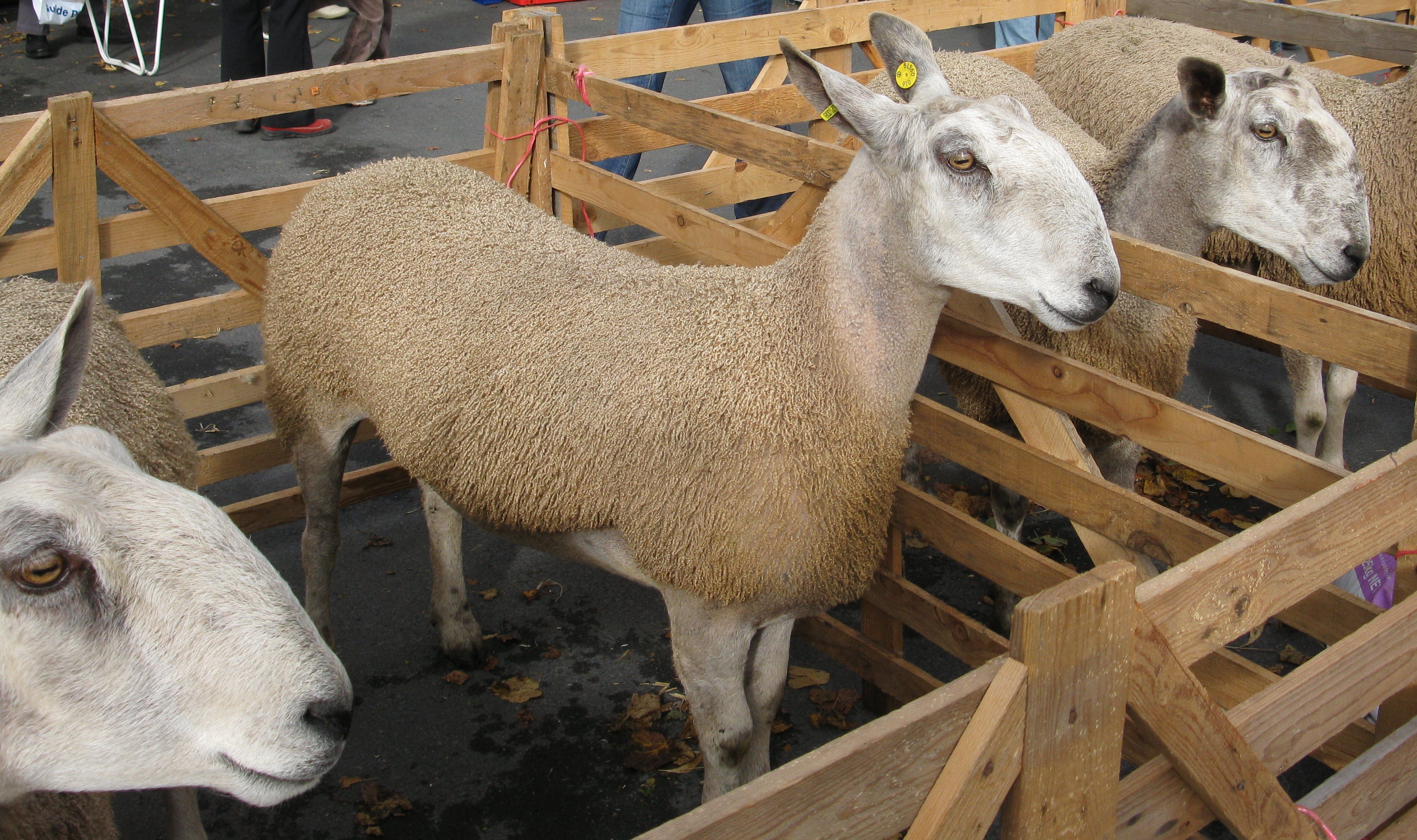
Ewes at the Masham Sheep Fair in 2010

The Bluefaced Leicester is a British breed of longwool sheep. It originated in north-east England in the late nineteenth or early twentieth century, and derives from the white-faced Border Leicester, with some influence from the blue-coloured Wensleydale and possibly also from the Teeswater. It was bred specifically for use as a crossing sire to be used on ewes of hill sheep breeds to produce mules. By about 1920 it was known either as the Bluefaced or as the Hexham Leicester, for the town of Hexham in Northumberland.

== History ==
The Bluefaced Leicester originated in the late nineteenth or early twentieth century in the north-east of England, mainly in the valleys of the Tyne and Wear rivers and in parts of Cumberland, to the west of the Pennines. In that area a preference had developed – in rams used for cross-breeding – for a dark skin, rather than the pale skin of the Border Leicester, which at that time was the principal crossing sire. Bluefaced sheep were bred from Border Leicester stock, with some influence from the blue-skinned Wensleydale and possibly also from the Teeswater. By the 1920s these were well established and were known either as the Bluefaced Leicester or as the Hexham Leicester, so named for the town of Hexham in Northumberland.

A breed association, the Bluefaced Leicester Sheep Breeders Association, was formed in 1962 or 1963. At about this time there were some 5000 ewes of breeding age; by the end of the twentieth century that number had risen to almost 20000.

Small numbers have been exported; there a few hundred head in the United States, while numbers in Canada, Holland and Ireland are unknown or negligible.

== Characteristics ==
It is a large sheep, among the tallest of British breeds, and long in the body: ewes stand some 85 cm at the withers, rams about 90 cm; average body weights are 80 kg and 115 kg respectively. It is naturally polled; the head is broad, with a markedly convex profile and long upward-pointing ears. The head and legs are without wool; the characteristic blue colour of the face results from the blue-grey skin showing through the fine white hair that covers it.

The wool is of longwool type, forming long curled ringlets; the fleece is light and fine, markedly different from that of the Border Leicester or Wensleydale, and the skin is delicate. The sheep may need shelter during the winter months.

== Use ==
In the dominant British system of stratification, Bluefaced rams are put over ewes of hill sheep breeds to produce mules, which are then bred to a terminal sire, resulting in a three-way cross. The ewe is most often a Blackface, and the resulting Scotch Mule predominates in commercial sheep breeding. Other Bluefaced Leicester mule crosses are the Cheviot Mule (with South Country Cheviot or North Country Cheviot ewes); the Exmoor Mule (with Exmoor Horn); the Highland Mule (with Scottish Blackface or Blackface × Swaledale cross); the North of England Mule (with Northumberland-type Blackface or Swaledale); and the Welsh Mule (with Beulah Speckled Face, Welsh Hill Speckled Face or Welsh Mountain).
