= Masham (sheep) =

Breed of sheep

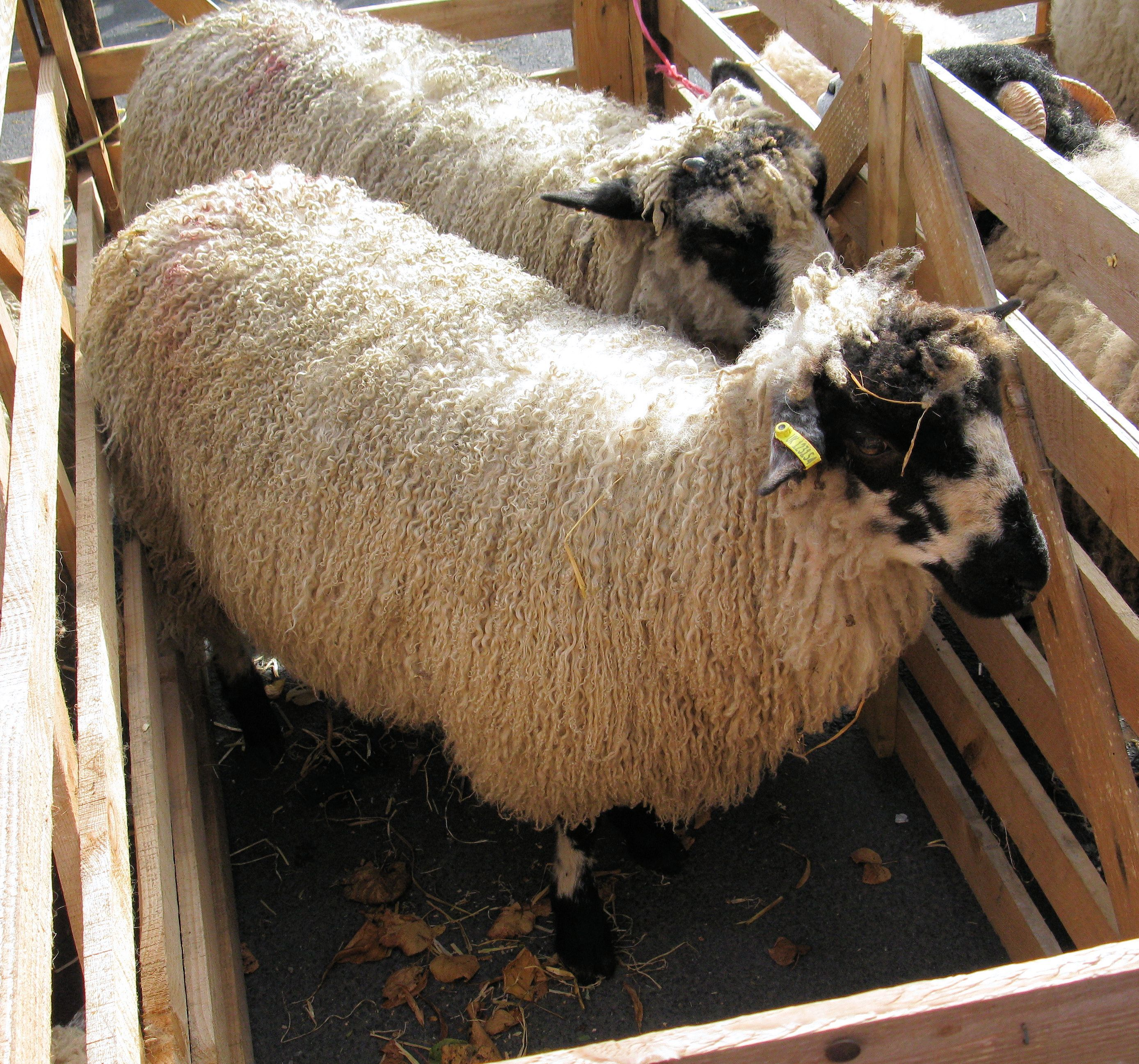
Masham sheep being shown at the town's Sheep Fair in 2010.

The Masham is a breed of domestic sheep which originated in northern England. It is the progeny of a Teeswater ram and either a Dalesbred or a Swaledale ewe. The ewes are hornless.

The breed takes its name from the town of Masham in lower Wensleydale, North Yorkshire.
