= Beulah Speckled Face =

Breed of sheep

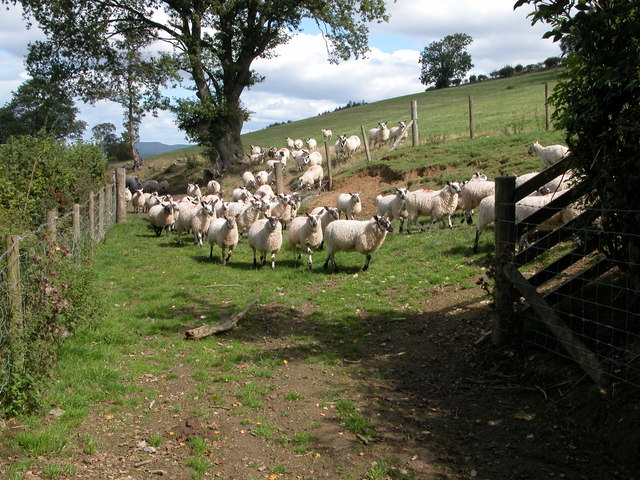
Welsh mule sheep near Cwmrhybin in Powys.

The Beulah Speckled Face is a breed of domestic sheep originating in the United Kingdom. Having been bred in the uplands of Wales for more than a hundred years, a breed society was officially formed in 1958. This breed is most common in Eppynt, Llanafan Fawr, Abergwesyn, and Llanwrtyd Wells, and it is little known outside Wales. The origins of the breed are unclear; it may be a truly native breed that has been selected to suit the local environment for centuries. The breed is named for its distinctly patterned black and white face, which is free from wool. The ewes, which are naturally polled, are often crossed with lowland rams such as the Suffolk, Texel or Bluefaced Leicester to breed mules, and to produce market lambs for meat. When bred pure, the lambs do not meet today's export demand for lean, fast-growing sheep. However, the ewes make good mothers and produce plenty of milk.

== Characteristics ==
The Beulah Speckled Face is a medium-sized breed although it is fairly large for a hill sheep. The face is free of wool and is white speckled with black, with a black muzzle, black around the eyes and around the ears. Neither ewes nor rams have horns and the legs are also black and white. Average Beulah Speckled Face ewes weigh 52 kg (115 lb), and rams weigh 86 kg (190 lb).

The fleece, which weighs from 1.4 to 3.5 kilograms (3.1 to 7.7 lb), is white with no dark fibres. The staple length is 7.5 to 12.5 centimetres (3 to 5 in) and the diameter of the wool is 25 to 36 microns. The wool has little crimp and dyes easily. It is used for hand spinning, weaving and knitting, to make garments and fabrics, and the coarser ranges are used for household textiles and rugs.
