= Masham (disambiguation) =

Masham is a town in North Yorkshire, England.

Masham may also refer to

- Masham, Yemen, a village in west central Yemen
- Masham (sheep), a breed named after the town
- Baron Masham, a title in the British peerage
- Damaris Cudworth Masham (1659-1708), English theologian
- Various villages in La Pêche, Quebec, Canada.
