= Beltex =

Breed of sheep

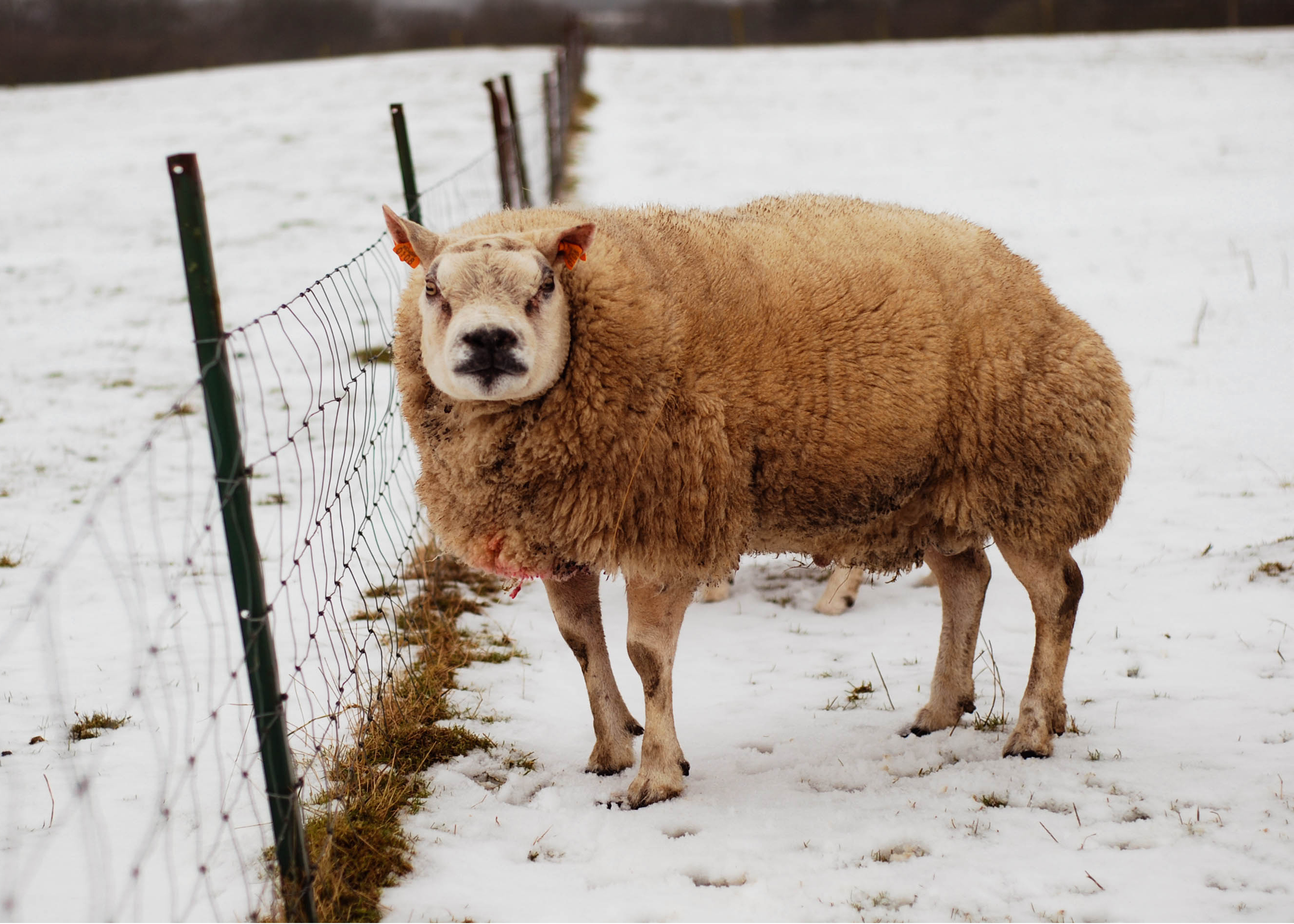
A two-year-old Belgian Beltex ram

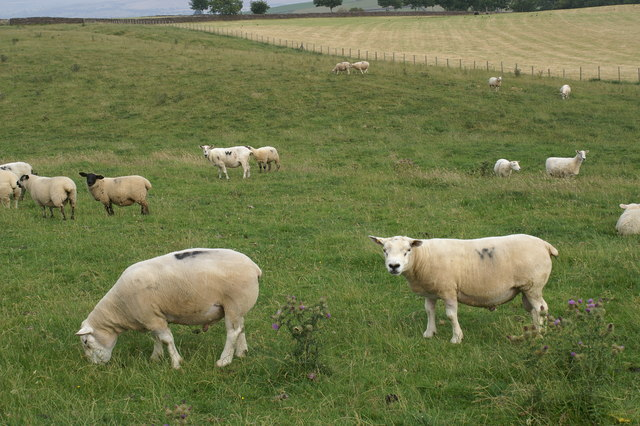
Beltex sheep near Great Asby

The Beltex is a breed of heavily muscled domestic sheep. A portmanteau of Belgian and Texel, the name reflects the breed's origin as an offshoot of Texel sheep from The Netherlands. In the late 1980s, Belgian Texels were exported to the United Kingdom, and it was there that it was primarily refined into its modern form. It is primarily used in Europe as a terminal sire, meaning Beltex rams are prized for mating with ewes to produce lambs for meat.

== Characteristics ==
The Beltex is a white faced sheep with medium length wool. It is best known for its extremely heavy muscling, especially in the hindquarters. Rams on average weigh 90 kg (200 lb) and ewes 70 kg (150 lb) at maturity. At the withers, rams grow to 60 cm (24 in) and ewes 50 cm (20 in) at maturity.
