= Blue Texel =

Dutch breed of sheep

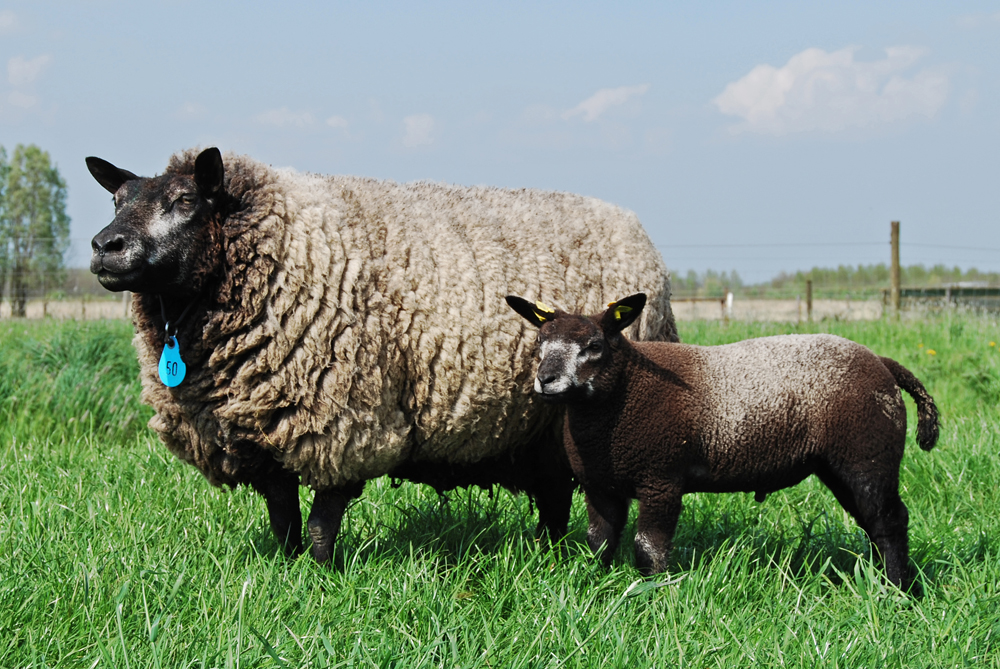
- Ewe with lamb

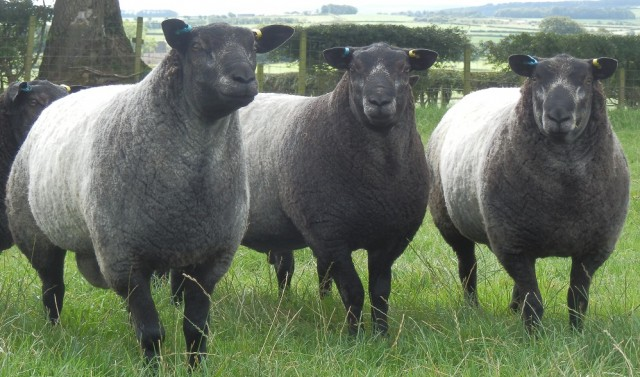
- Conservation status: FAO (2007): not at risk; DAD-IS (2026): vulnerable/at risk
- Other names: Blauwe Texelaar
- Country of origin: Netherlands
- Use: meat

Traits
- Weight: Male: 100 kg; Female: 80 kg
- Height: Male: 72 cm; Female: 68 cm
- Wool colour: blue

The Blue Texel, Dutch: Blauwe Texelaar, is a Dutch breed or strain of meat sheep. It is a colour variety of the Texel, which originates on the island of Texel in the Wadden Sea. A flock-book for blue sheep within the Texel breed was started in 1983, and a breed society was formed in that year.

== History ==
The Texel originates on the island of Texel in the Wadden Sea. Blue-woolled lambs were sometimes born in Texel flocks, but little attention was paid to them until the 1970s, when deliberate breeding for blue colour began, and some blue flocks were established. A flock-book for blue sheep within the Texel breed was started in 1983, and a breed society – the Fokgroep Blauwe Texelaars – was formed in that year by seven breeders; this later became the Stamboek Blauwe Texelaars.

By 2008–2009 numbers had risen to about 6500 head; in 2022 the total population was estimated at 6901, with 4627 registered breeding ewes and 507 active rams. Its conservation status was listed by the FAO as 'not at risk' in 2007; in 2026 it was listed in DAD-IS as 'vulnerable/at risk'.

Outside Holland, the Blue Texel is reported by Belgium, Germany and Scotland.
