= Charollais sheep =

Breed of sheep

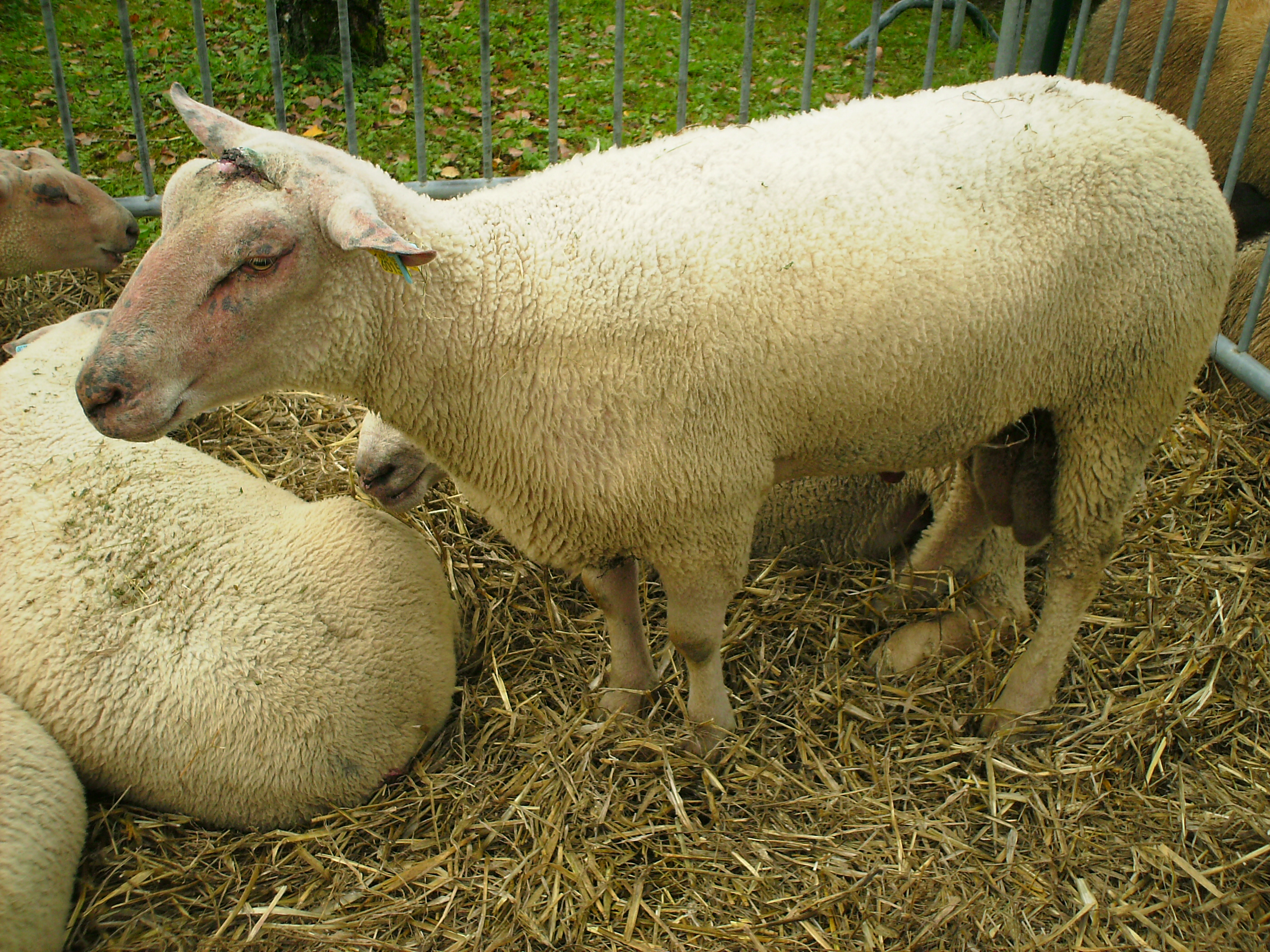
Shorn Charollais ram

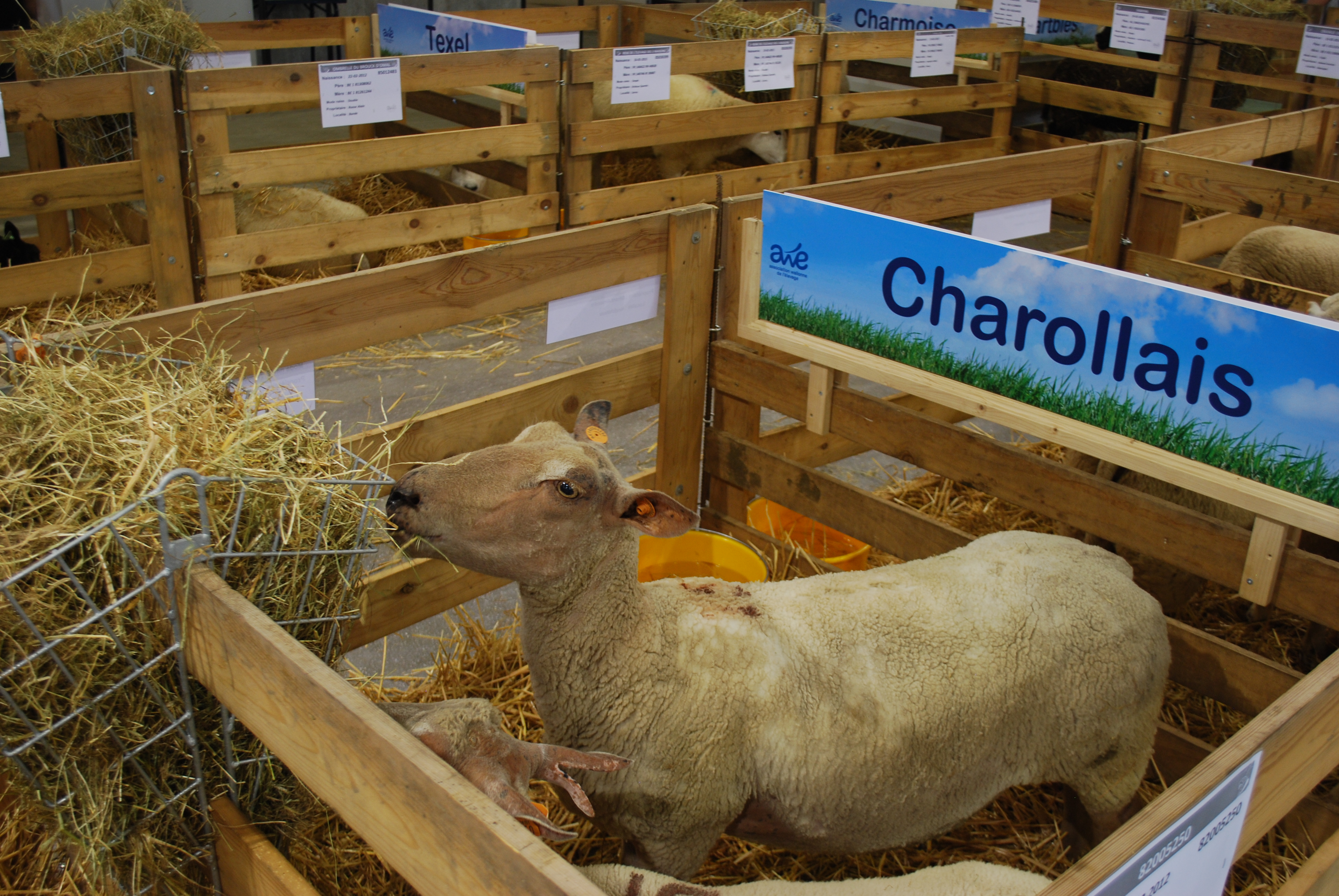
Charollais sheep

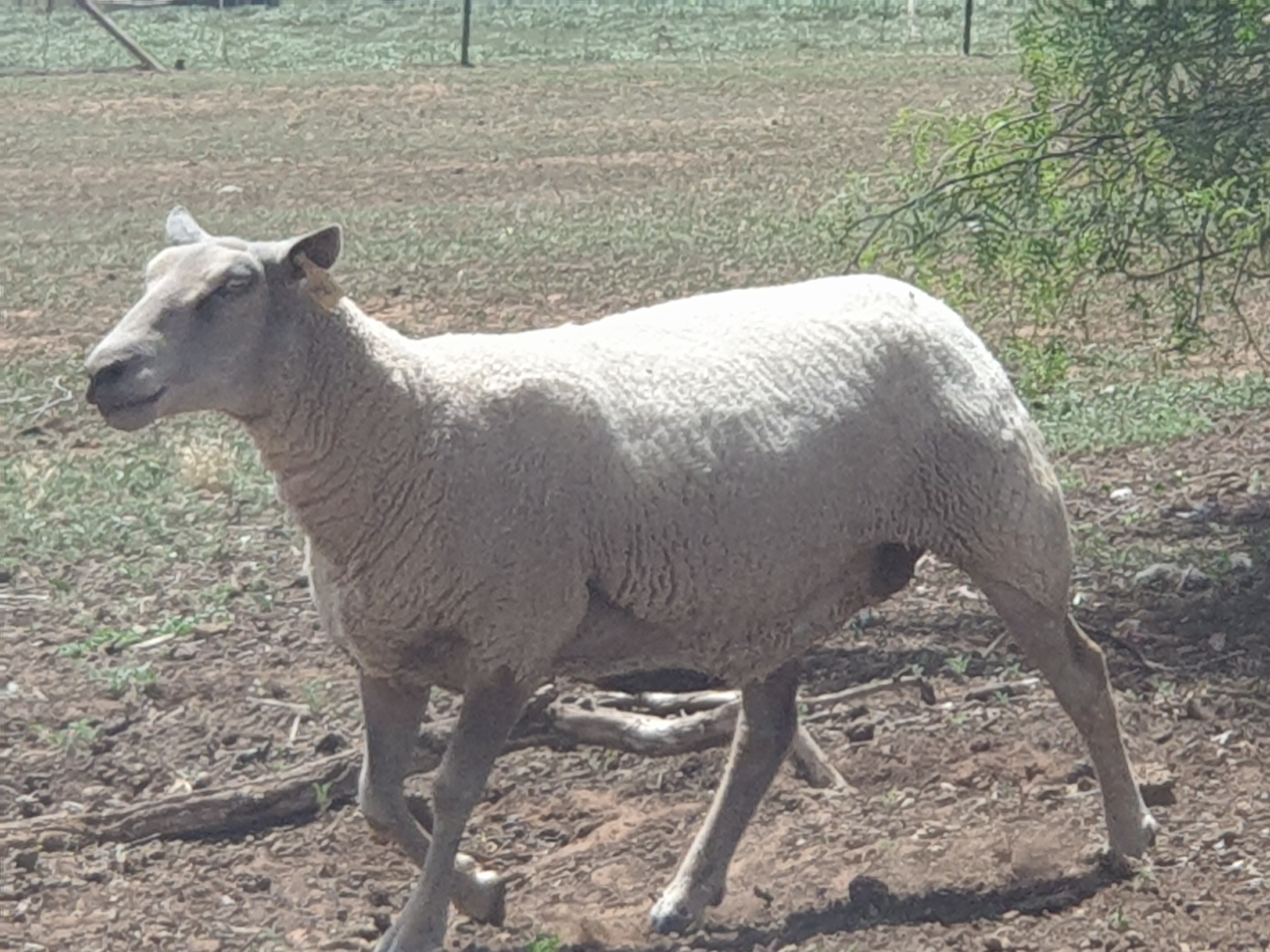
Charollais ewe

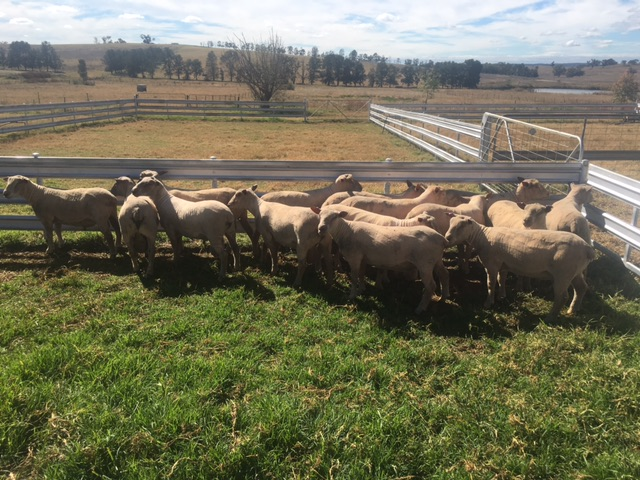
Charollais rams

The Charollais is a breed of domestic sheep originating in east central France, in the same region in which Charolais cattle originated, Charolles and Saône-et-Loire. It is known for ease of lambing and is used as a terminal sire to increase muscling and growth rate of the lambs. It has been exported internationally, and is commonly used in the United Kingdom as a sire to produce market lambs from pure-bred ewes and mules.

== History ==
This breed originates in the Charolles and Saône-et-Loire regions of East-Central France, developed in the 19th century from local breeds and intended to be crossed with the British Dishley Leicester. The breed was first introduced to the UK in 1977 where it was further improved. Charollais sheep were introduced to Ireland in 1990 and Canada in 1994.

== General characteristics ==
=== Physical characteristics ===
The Charollais sheep is a medium to large sized breed used as a terminal sire. The head is pinkish-brown and is usually free of wool but may have a fine covering of pale coloured hair and both sexes are polled (without horns). It is long in the back, wedge shaped and well-muscled. A high frequency of the Myostatin gene mutation is responsible for the increased muscling observed in the Charollais breed. The breed is fine boned making for a high killing out percentage. The legs are brown, quite short and free of wool. On average at maturity, rams weigh 135 kg (300 lb) and ewes weigh 90 kg (200 lb).

=== Temperament ===
Charollais ewes display a docile temperament and good maternal instincts, making them both easy to work with and excellent mothers.

=== Wool ===
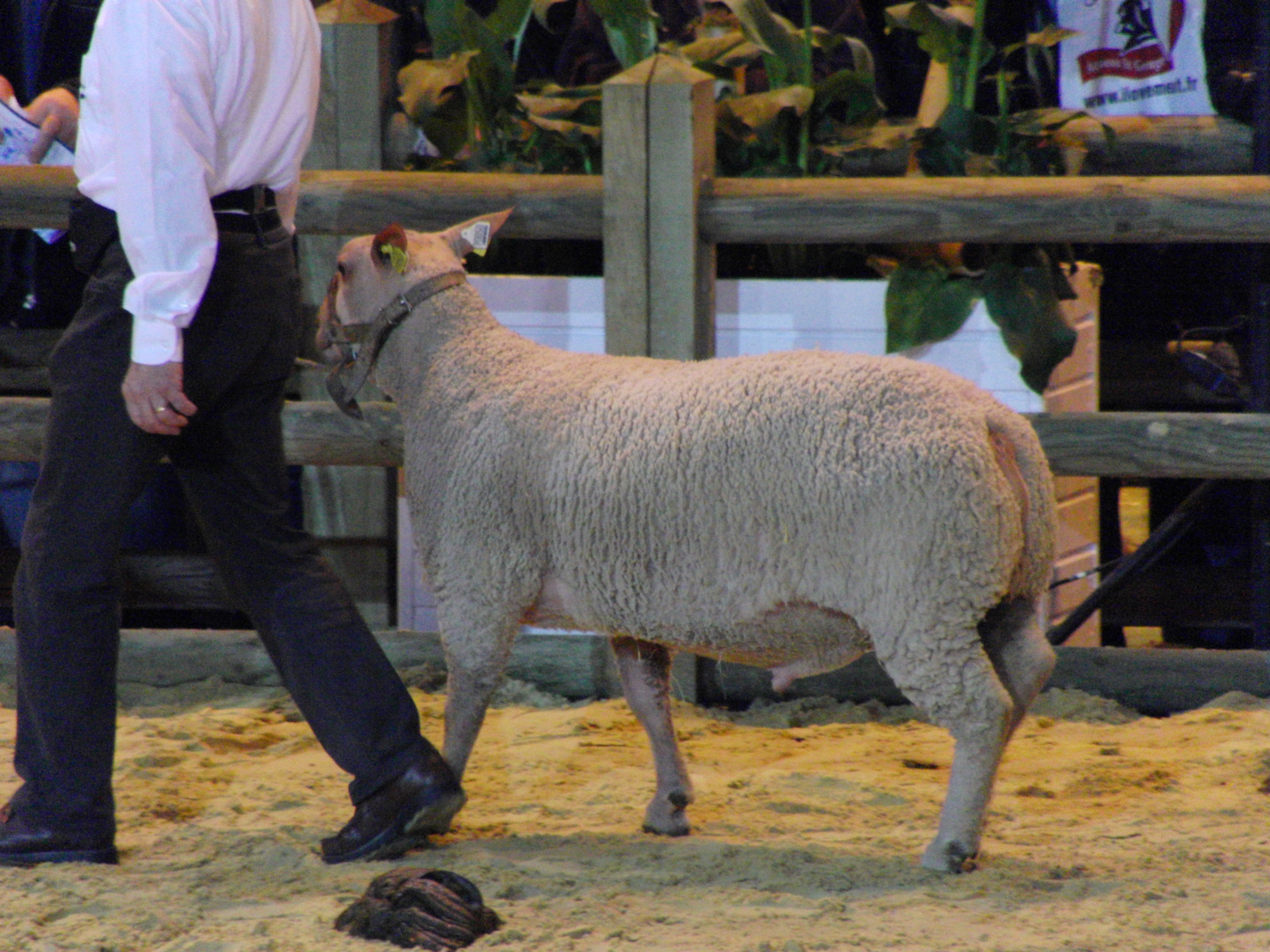
At the Salon de l'Agriculture in 2010

The fleece usually weighs between 2 and 2.5 kg (4.4 and 5.5 lb) and has a staple length of 4 to 6 cm (1.6 to 2.4 in). The wool is medium grade and measures 56 to 60 on the Bradford count, with a diameter of 29 to 30.5 microns.

=== Reproduction ===
The pure bred ram is willing and eager to mate for most of the year and is long-lived. Rams reach sexual maturity at approximately 7 months of age and many are still working at seven years of age and some live to ten. The ewes have an extended breeding season and are prolific; those lambing in December average 180% while those lambing in February reach 200%. The ease of lambing achieved due to their small head size and wedge shaped body means minimal stress to both the ewe and lamb. Lambs are vigorous, keen to suck and have a rapid growth rate. Ewe lambs can be bred at seven months, when they reach sexual maturity. Birth weights average 5.0 kg (11 lbs) for singles, 4.0 kg (9 lbs) for twins and 3.5 kg (8 lbs) for triplets.

=== Production ===
The Charollais breed excels in both pasture or confinement system, making them versatile for the modern shepherd. The breed is known to maintain body condition well through production cycles. The Charollais breed is known to produce a high quality, lean carcass and have a high meat to bone ratio. Dressing percentage is above average at ≈50-59%.

== Breed standards ==
=== Structural correctness ===
Structural correctness incorporates aspects of conformation that encourage good health and well-being. Charollais animals selected for breeding should display structural correctness in relation to teeth, displaying short straight teeth, resting directly on the pad. Feet should be neat and not misshapen, pasterns should be short, straight an upright. Legs should be a medium distance apart with appropriate fineness of bone. Hind legs should have a good definition of hock. The shoulders and top-line should be level and strong with good length and fleshy. Undesirable traits include narrow or pointed top-line and/or shoulders and excessive fat. Rams should display two balanced testicles of adequate size and Ewes should display an udder free of lumps and malformations.

=== Breed characteristics ===
Breed characteristics define traits that set the Charollais breed apart from other sheep breeds that are retained through pure-breeding.

Charollais sheep should display a loin that is long, wide and deep without excessive fat. The eye muscle should be full. The leg-of-lamb should be thick, deep and full and rump should be thick and wide. Good growth rate is desirable. Charollais heads should display a pink skin color with a varying amount of light coloured hair. They should be appropriately small muzzles with broader shape between the eyes. Ewes should display a feminine kind head while rams should be distinctively more masculine in appearance. Wool should cover the body without breaks but not extend down the legs or over the head. Fleece should be dense and of good quality.
