= Rough Fell =

Breed of sheep

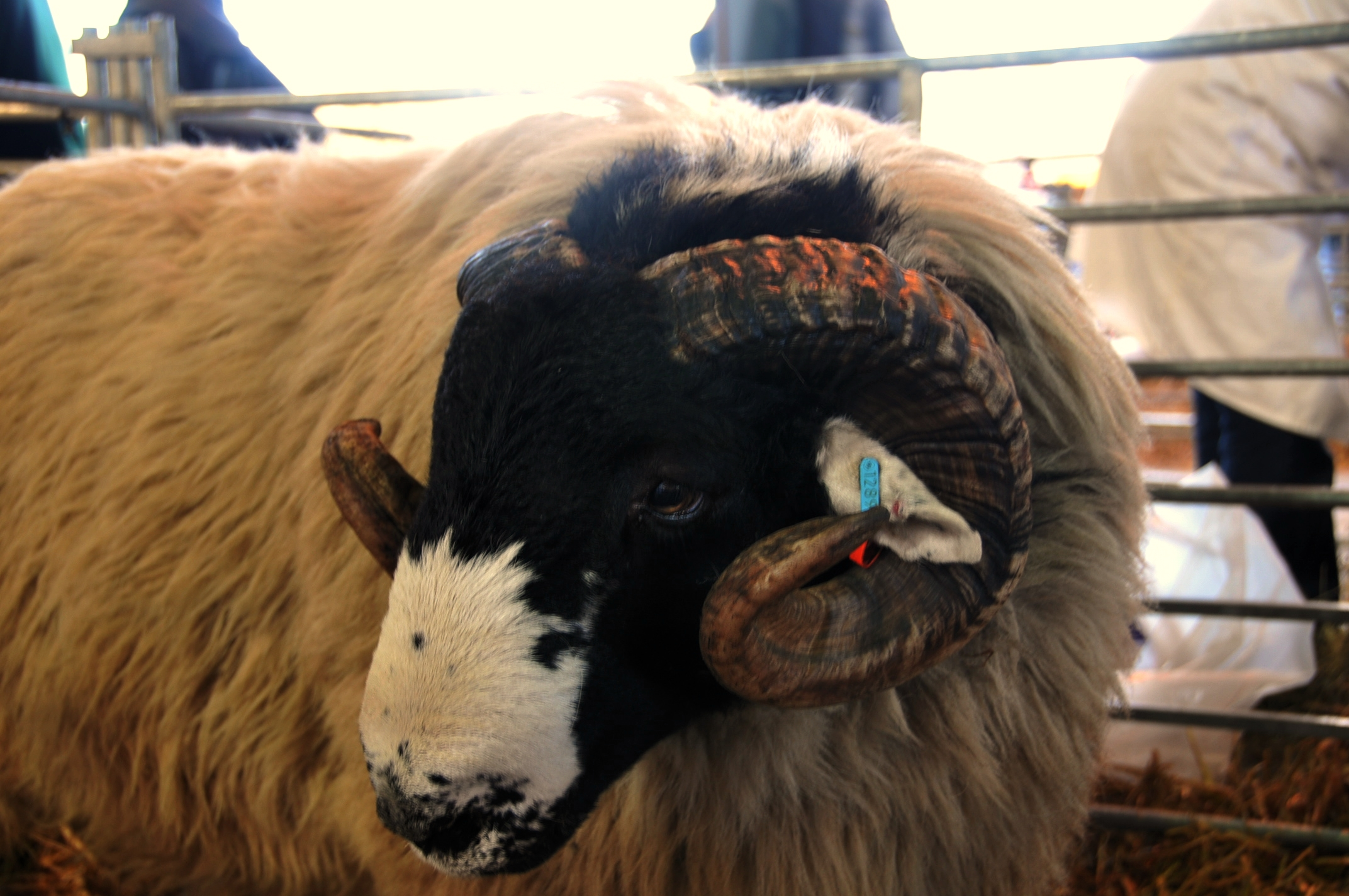
A Rough Fell ram

The Rough Fell is an upland breed of sheep originating in England. It is common on fell and moorland farms, its distribution embracing a large proportion of South Cumbria, parts of the West Riding of Yorkshire, North Lancashire and, more recently, upland parts of Devon. It is very hardy and, as its name suggests, has proved to be well-suited to endure the hardships of exposed and high moorland and mountains. It is one of the largest mountain breeds in Britain. This breed is raised primarily for meat.

== Characteristics ==
The rough is a dual-purpose commercial breed. Its wool is used for carpet and mattress making and, as it is one of the biggest hill breeds, it is sold for its meat as well. Mature ewes weigh 70 kilograms (150 lb) on average and rams 90 kilograms (200 lb) As hill sheep roam freely over hundreds of acres of communal grazing on open fell land, their meat is as near to that of a wild animal as one can get in a farmed animal.

The hardy constitution of the breed enables a ewe to mother and rear her lambs whilst feeding mainly on the poor upland grasses and heathers found on her native moorland. Because of the type of fleece, the breed requires no housing, even in the most inclement weather.

Rough Fell sheep can be recognised for the broad white patch across their black faces, and both rams and ewes are horned. They are mostly used by farmers on their native fell farms for pure breeding, but many are used for crossing with other breeds, contributing their hardiness and adaptation to upland conditions.

== History ==
The ‘Rough’ is probably descended, along with its ‘cousins’ the Scottish Blackface, the Swaledale, the Dalesbred and the Lonk, from a sheep called, the ‘black faced heath breed’, mentioned in William Youatt's ‘Mountain Shepherds Manual’ in 1837 and 1883. This heath breed was the main sheep breed across most of the north of England and south of Scotland for 500 years and already had the distinctive black face and legs, curled horns and thick white fleece. However there are memories of some rough fell flicks being bred by Herdwick sheep associated with the Lake District.

The breed's full name was originally the ‘Kendal or Middleton Rough Fell’, due to the fact that it evolved on the rough fells surrounding Kendal. Nearly all the total flock is kept within a 30 mile radius of Kendal, making it a very specialised local breed.
