= Wensleydale sheep =

British breed of sheep

Wensleydale
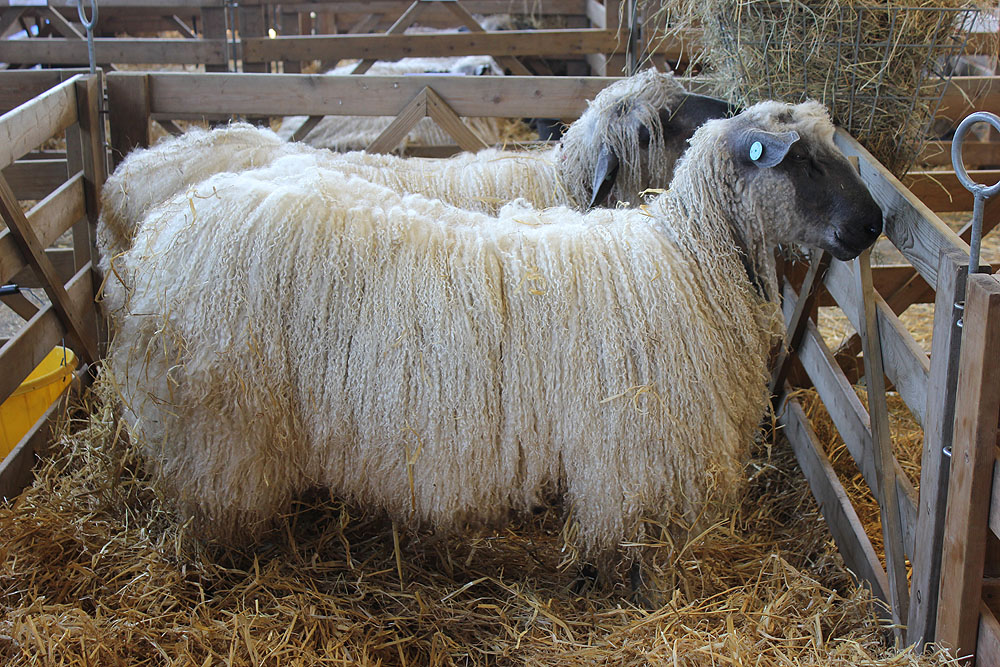

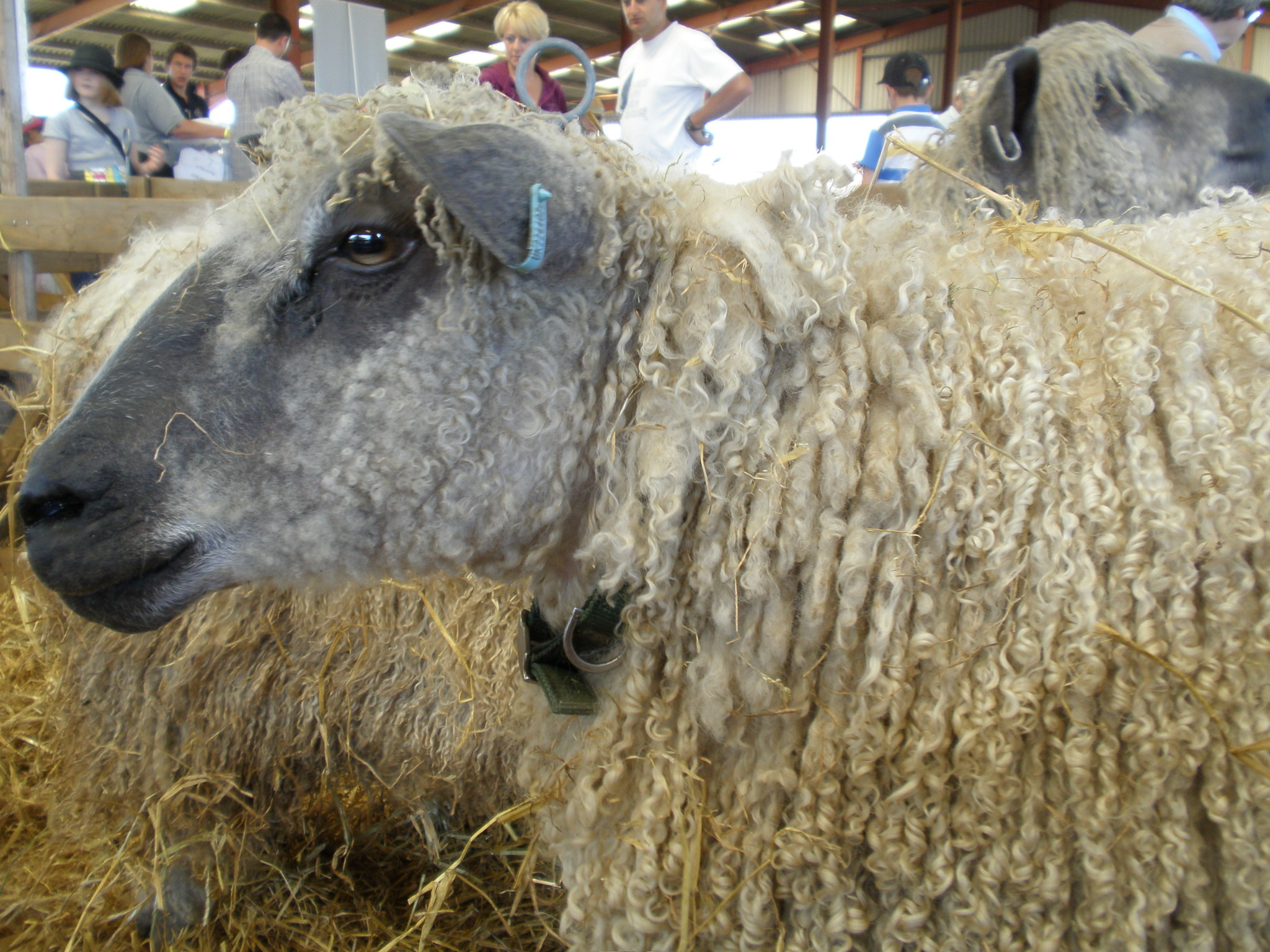
- Conservation status: FAO (2007): not at risk; RBST (2019): at risk; DAD-IS (2025): at risk/endangered
- Country of origin: United Kingdom
- Standard: Wensleydale Longwool Sheep Breeders Association

The Wensleydale is a British breed of sheep. It is named for the Wensleydale region of North Yorkshire, in the north of England, where it was bred in the early nineteenth century by cross-breeding a Dishley Leicester ram with local long-woolled sheep of a breed that is now extinct. It is among the heaviest of British sheep breeds. It has a deep blue-grey face and ears, which are free of wool except for the forelock or "topping"; the fleece is purled and lustrous, and hangs to the ground. In the twenty-first century it is an endangered breed, categorised as "at risk" by the Rare Breeds Survival Trust. It is often used as a ram breed to cross with other breeds to obtain market lambs, and for its high-quality wool.

== History ==
The mating of a Leicester ram with a Teeswater ewe in 1838 made the famous ram Bluecap who was the first sire of the Wensleydale breed.

Two breed societies were formed in the late nineteenth century; after the First World War they merged to form the Wensleydale Longwool Sheep Breeders Association.

The Wensleydale contributed to the development of the Blue-faced Leicester.

== Characteristics ==
The Wensleydale has a grey-black face, ears and legs. The ears are slightly elongated and stand upright. They are naturally polled (without horns) and have a tuft of long wool on top of the head which is not typically shorn (for aesthetic purposes).The wool that falls between the ears and across the face is known as the topping.

Rams weigh about 126 kg (280 lb) and ewes about 90 kg (200 lb).

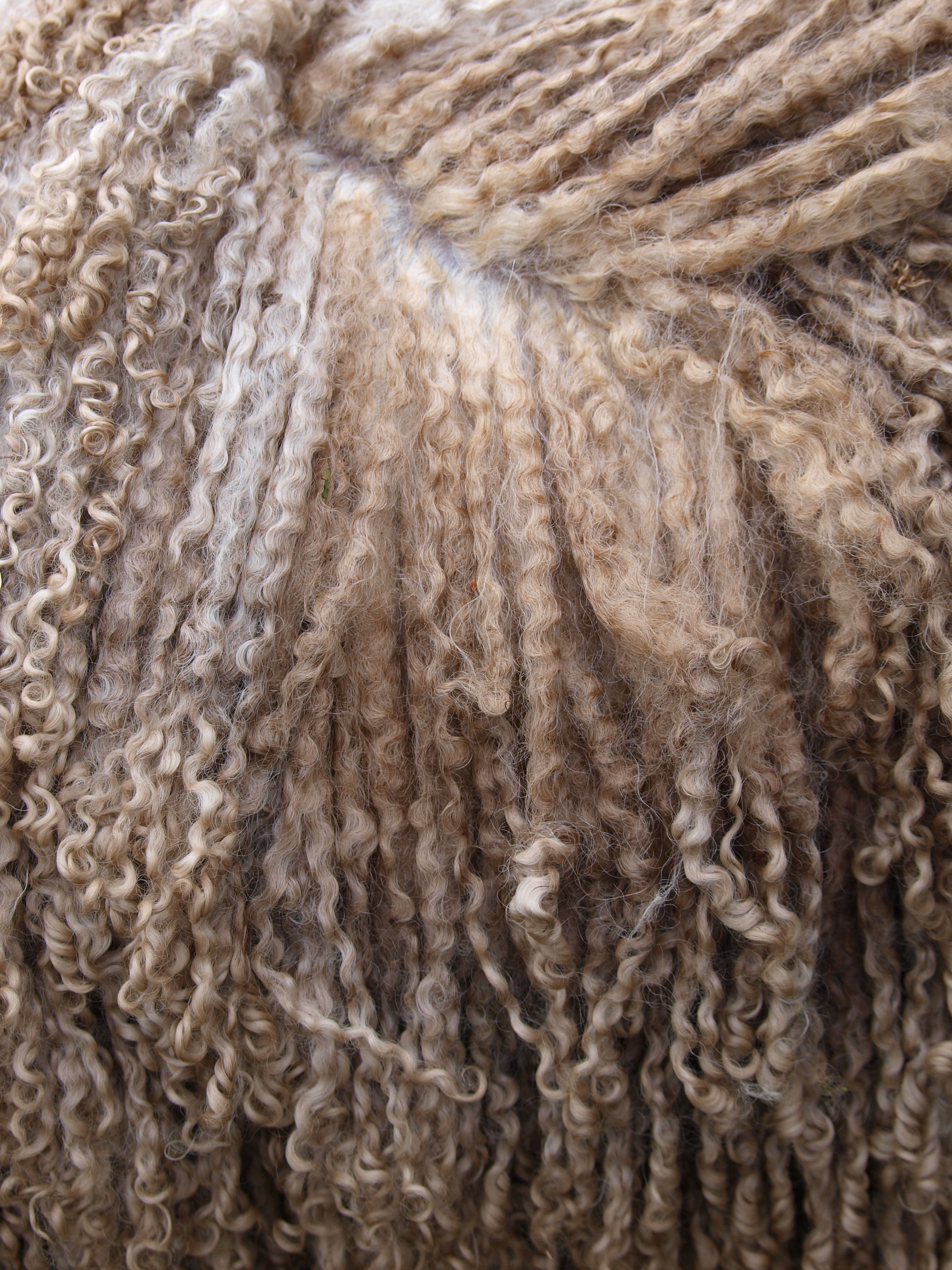
The fleece

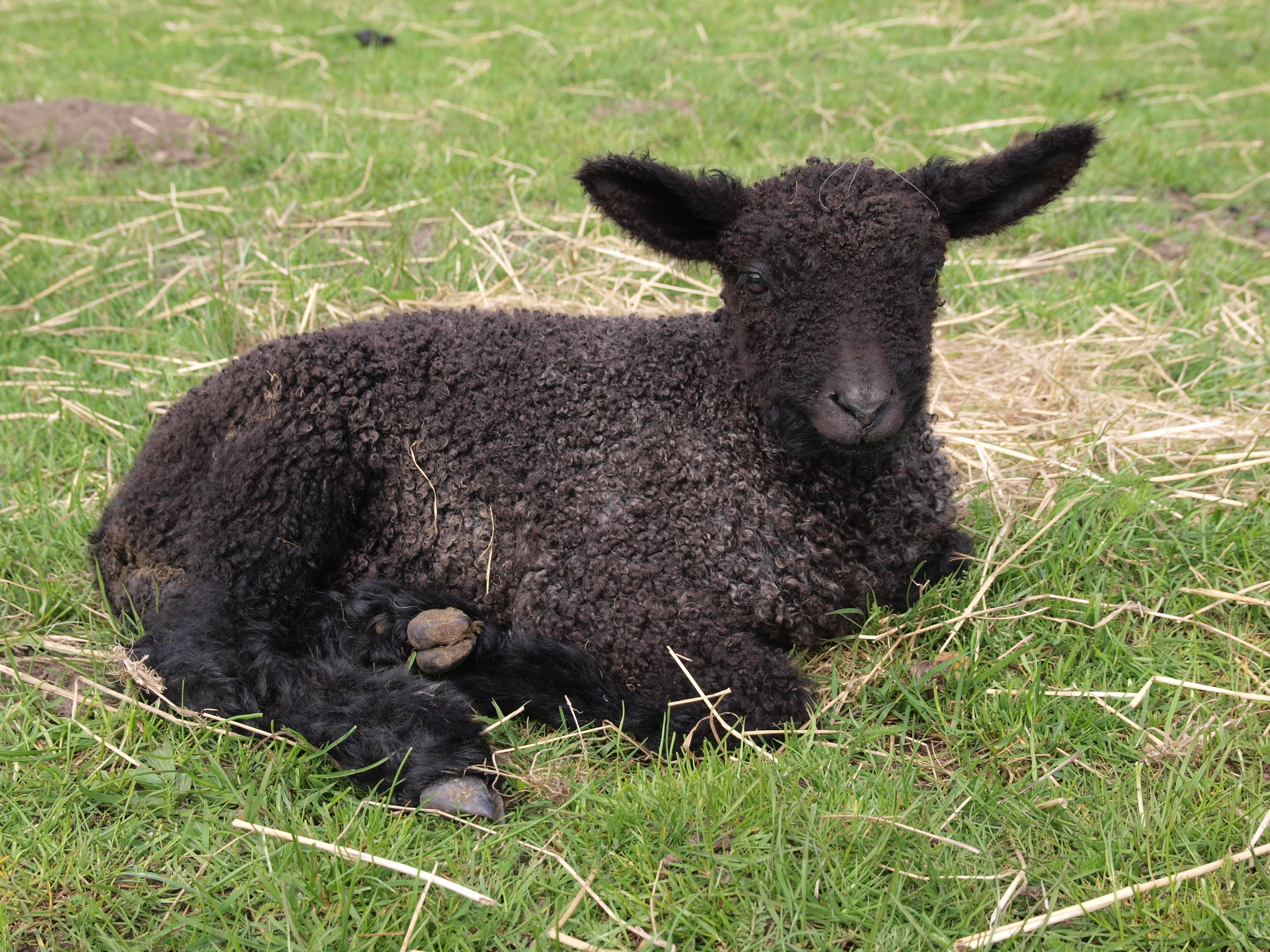
A six-day-old lamb

After shearing
