= Swaledale sheep =

Breed of sheep

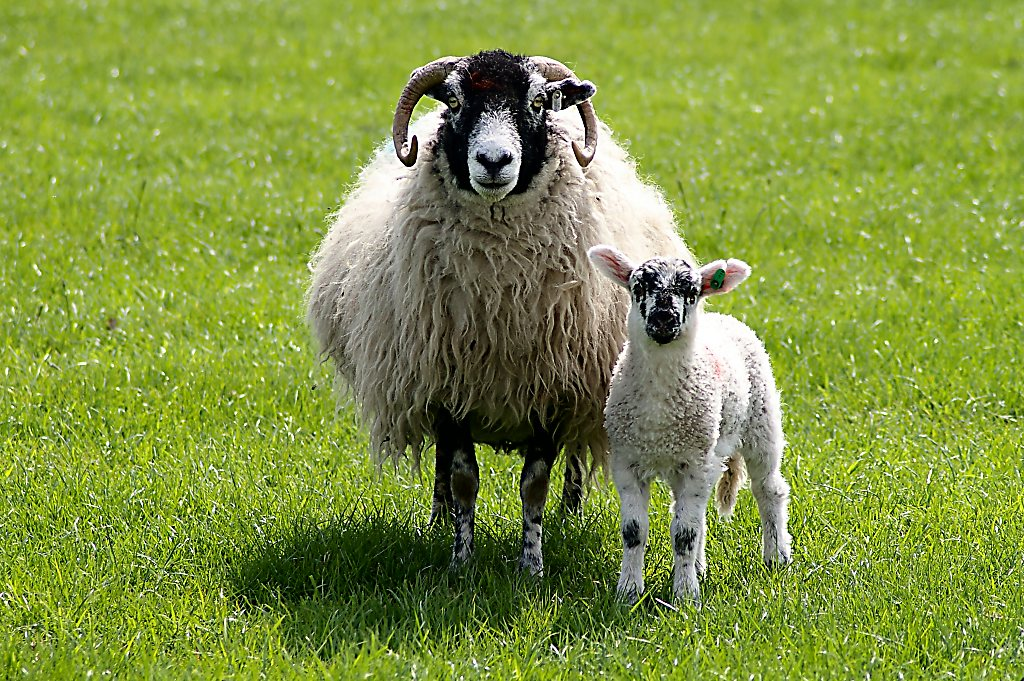
A Swaledale ewe and mule lamb

Swaledale is a breed of domestic sheep named after the Yorkshire valley of Swaledale in England. They are found throughout the more mountainous areas of Great Britain, but particularly in the Yorkshire Dales, County Durham, and around the Pennine fells of Cumbria.

Swaledales are noted for their off-white wool, curled horns and white around their nose and eyes. They are used for the production of lamb/mutton, the North of England Mule sheep, and as Pedigree breeding stock. Together with the Rough Fell, Herdwick, and Dalesbred sheep, they are one of the four variations associated with the English Lake District.

== Breed characteristics ==
Well suited to the exposed regions in which they predominantly live, the Swaledales are very hardy, able-bodied, and bold. The ewes make excellent mothers and are known for being able to rear lambs well, even in adverse conditions. They are of a medium build, with black faces marked with bright white around the nose and eyes. Males and females both grow curled horns; however, the male's horns are much larger. Their coats are thick and very coarse, and are considered a uniform white or off-white colour. The wool they produce, although durable, resilient and usable for a number of applications, is worth very little, with the British Wool Marketing Board paying approximately 40 pence per kilo of wool. The marketed fleece and fibre may contain kemp that is not white, so some yarns and prepared fibres from the Swaledale are grey. The sheep are also known for their tender and good-flavoured lamb and mutton.

== Breed history ==
The Swaledales as a breed are related to Scottish Blackface and Rough Fell sheep, both of which are also predominant in upland locations in the United Kingdom and noted for their ability to thrive in exposed locations. Although the specific origins of the breed are unknown, a non-indigenous and exotic ancestor for the Swaledale was considered by two noted names of the eighteenth century, John Naismyth and Charles Findlater. Published in 1796, Naismyth's opinion in Young's Annals of Agriculture was that the origin of the black-faced highland breeds was "impossible to trace". Robert Trow-Smith in his book A History of British Livestock Husbandry, 1700–1900 wrote: "... it has already been suggested that this family stood outside the main stream of ancient British sheep..." and that the root of the Swaledale and Scottish Blackface breeds could be the Argali. This tenuous link between domestic sheep and the wild Argali has since been proved to be insupportable due to a significant difference in genetic make-up and number of chromosomes.

Before the Swaledale, Scottish Blackface, and Rough Fell emerged as distinct breeds, their 17th-century forerunner was the Linton. It was named after the West Linton market in Peeblesshire, which specialised in selling the hardy Lintons for Scottish Highland and other upland farming. At the beginning of the 18th century, the market is recorded as having sold upwards of 9,000 sheep in a single day, numbers which surely helped establish the breed firmly in upland areas.

The Swaledale Sheep Breeders Association was founded in 1919 and originally consisted of farmers living within a seven-mile radius of the Tan Hill Inn, on the North Yorkshire moors. The association is an active organisation point for Swaledale sales, shows, breeding, and products.

== Farming and breeding ==
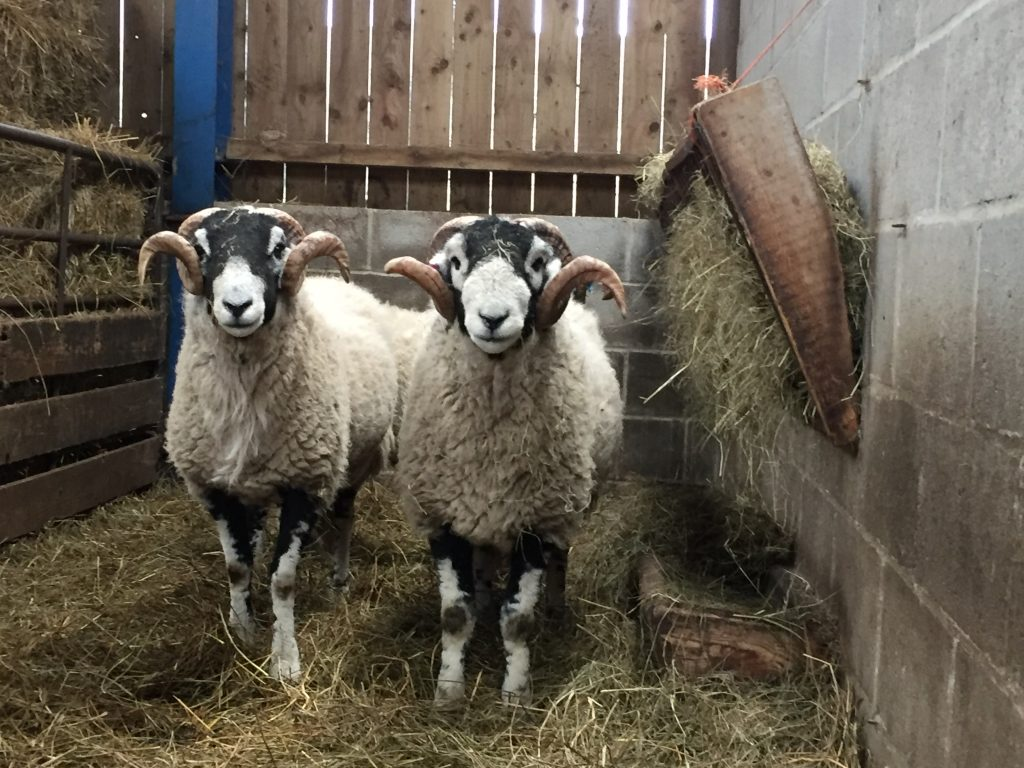
Swaledale Tups

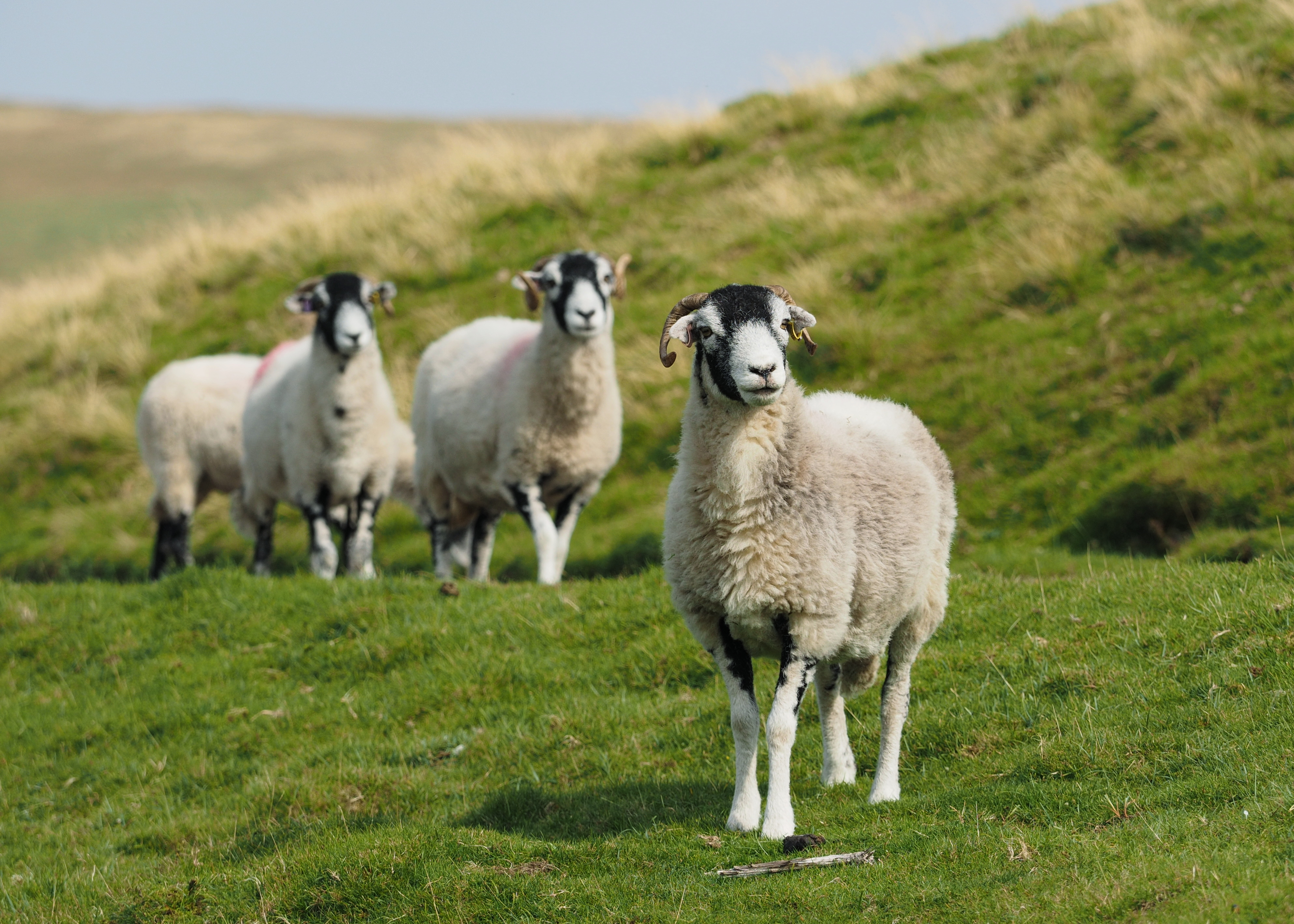
Swaledale Sheep on Oxnop Scar, a southern tributary of Swaledale

There are approximately 1,200 flocks of pedigree Swaledale sheep in the United Kingdom. Fine pedigree tups (rams) sell for approximately £2,000 to £5,000 on average, though the highest price paid at auction for a prized ram was £101,000. Being a hardy breed, farmers are able to rear their Swaledale flocks in remote and exposed locations, generally without needing to provide indoor accommodation.

The sheep produce commercially viable mutton and wool. Swaledale mutton has good flavour and tenderness. Wool colour and coarseness prevents Swaledale wool from fetching high prices, but its strong and durable properties make it suitable for carpets, rugs, and insulation. However, the wool is also used for spinning and knitting of clothing, though on a lesser scale to its other uses.

The Swaledale sheep is an official symbol of the Yorkshire Dales. In 2003, plans were submitted to build a Swaledale sheep visitor centre in Kirkby Stephen, Cumbria, declaring Kirkby Stephen as the "spiritual home of the Swaledale sheep". These plans drew strong opposition from the town of Hawes, in Yorkshire, a strong competitor in terms of Swaledale sales, and which had its own plans for a visitor centre.

A control flock of Swaledales has been used to study and develop scrapie-resistant sheep. An infectious, persistent, and spontaneous disease, animals infected with scrapie must be quarantined and destroyed. The experimental breeding involved selecting a group of Swaledale sheep with low suspectability to the disease, injecting them with the agents of the disease, and breeding from the survivors. The research has concluded that the offspring of the infected sheep are more able to survive scrapie.

A commercially successful breed, the North of England Mule, has been produced from the Swaledale ewes, by mating with Bluefaced Leicesters. The offspring of this cross are now a commonly seen lowland sheep.
