= Texel sheep =

Dutch breed of sheep

Texel
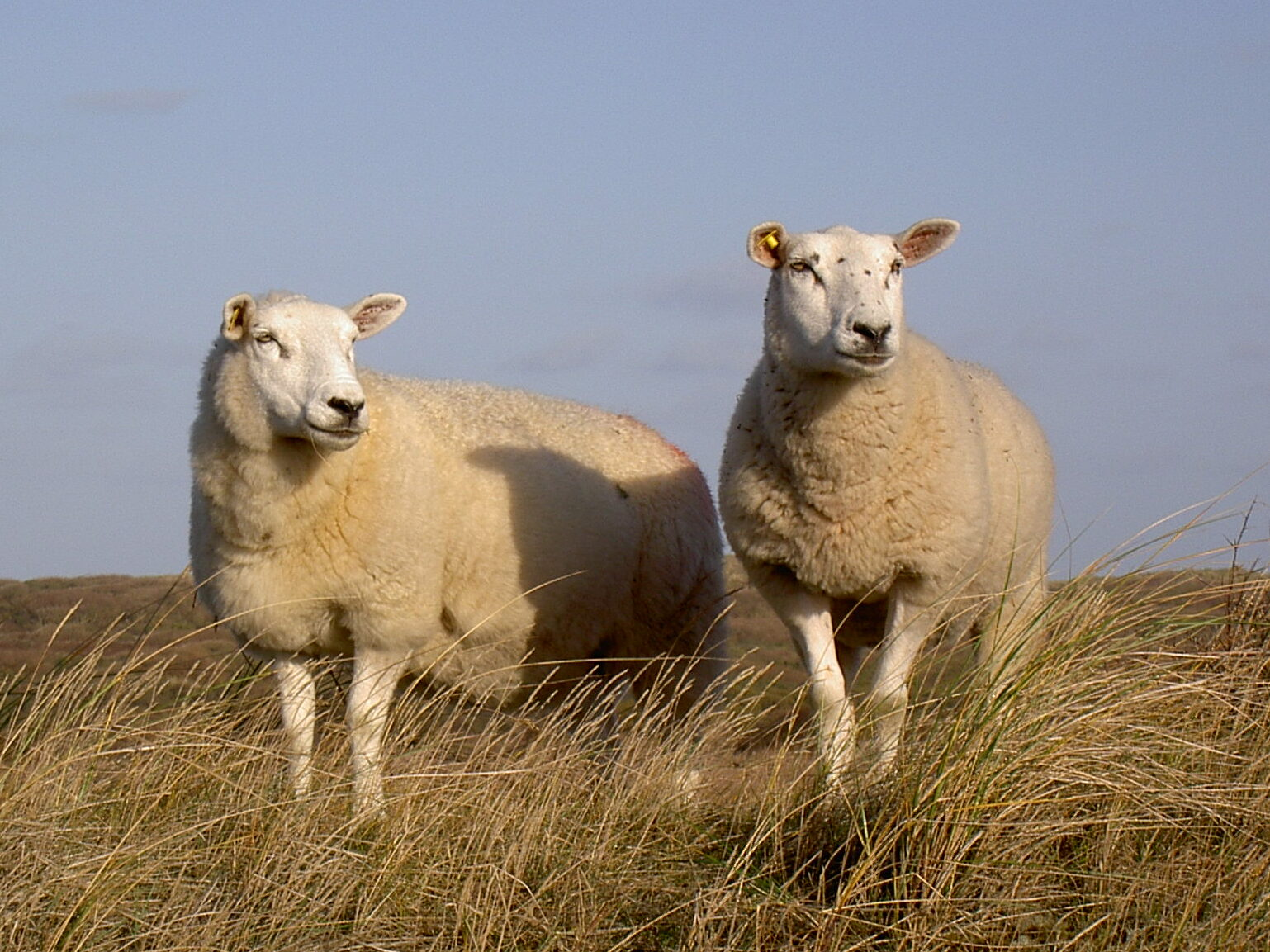

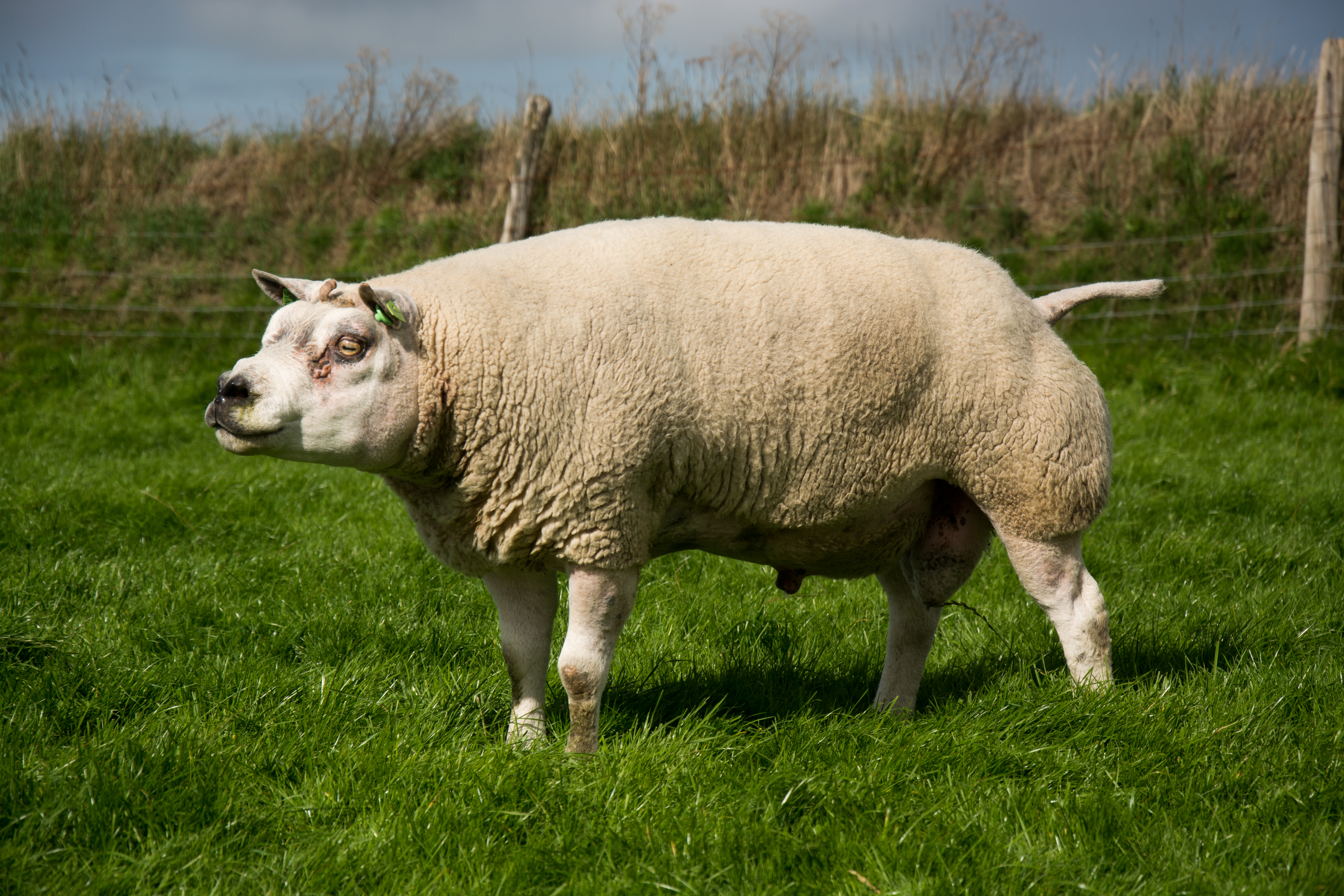
- Conservation status: FAO (2007): not at risk; DAD-IS (2023): not at risk
- Other names: Texelaar; Texelse; Improved Texel; Verbeterde Texelse
- Country of origin: Netherlands
- Use: meat, wool, cheese

Traits
- Weight: Male: average 95 kg; Female: average 75 kg
- Height: Male: average 70 cm; Female: average 68 cm
- Wool colour: white
- Face colour: white
- Horn status: polled

The Texel is a Dutch breed of domestic sheep originally from the island of Texel off the north coast of the Netherlands. It is a heavy and muscular sheep, often exhibiting extreme muscular hypertrophy, and tends to produce leaner lambs than some other breeds. It is polled, clean-faced and clean-legged, with white face and wool.

The Texel is distributed in approximately thirty-five countries in Europe, the Americas and Oceania, with estimated populations of over 5000 head in Argentina, Brazil, Chile, the Czech Republic and the United Kingdom. It is reared primarily for meat.

A number of other breeds or sub-types derive from it. These include the Blue Texel, a colour variant with breed status; the British Texel, developed in Scotland in the latter twentieth century; the French Texel, developed in France from about 1930; and the Beltex and Swifter breeds.

== History ==
The Texel originated on the island of Texel, the largest of the Wadden Islands off the north coast of the Netherlands. The original sheep of the island were relatively long-legged animals of polder or marshland type, not dissimilar to the Fries Melkschaap. From the early years of the nineteenth century, these were systematically cross-bred with imported British stock of various breeds – among them the Border Leicester, the Leicester Longwool, the Lincoln Longwool and the Wensleydale – with the aim of improving meat production qualities. A herd-book was established in 1909.

In the twenty-first century the Texel constitutes approximately 70% of all meat sheep in the Netherlands. A number of other breeds or sub-types derive from it. These include the Blue Texel, a colour variant with breed status; the British Texel, developed in Scotland in the latter twentieth century; the French Texel, developed in France from about 1930; and the Beltex and Swifter breeds.

Stock imported from France by the Animal Breeding Research Organisation in Scotland in 1970 was cross-bred with a variety of British breeds including the Border Leicester, Hampshire Down, Leicester, Lincoln and Southdown, leading to the development of the British Texel; a herd-book was started in 1972. It is larger and heavier than the original Dutch stock, with weights to 120 kg for rams and 85 kg for ewes. It is the most numerous British breed, with a population in the early twenty-first century of some 350000 ewes. Some of the sheep are valuable: a ram lamb was sold in Lanark in 2009 for £231000, and in 2020 another was auctioned for almost £368000.

== Characteristics ==
The Texel is a heavy and muscular sheep, often exhibiting extreme muscular hypertrophy, and tends to produce leaner lambs than some other breeds. It is polled, clean-faced and clean-legged, with white face and wool. Average body weights are approximately 95 kg for rams and about 75 kg for ewes; average heights at the withers are about 70 cm and 68 cm respectively.

A mutation in the 3' UTR of the myostatin gene in Texel sheep, which creates target sites for the microRNAs miR-1 and miR-206, may be the cause of the muscular hypertrophy seen in the breed.

== Use ==
The Texel is reared primarily for lamb's meat, often by use as a terminal sire.

Fleece weights are usually in the range 3.5–5.5 kg. The fibre diameter averages about 32 μm (Bradford Count 46s–56s), with a staple length of 8–15 cm; the wool is used mainly to make yarns for knitting and for hosiery.

== Gallery ==
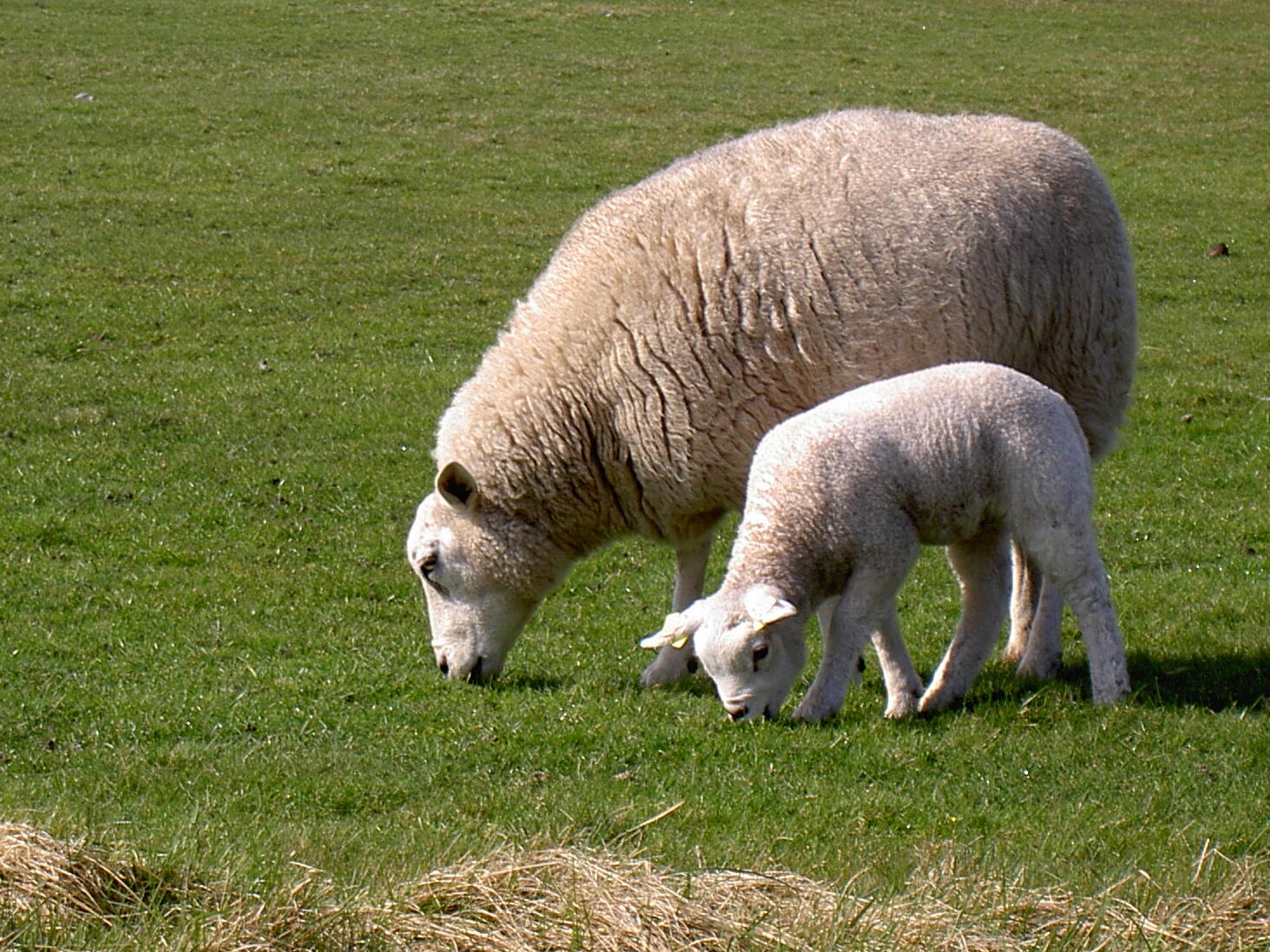
Ewe with lamb on Texel

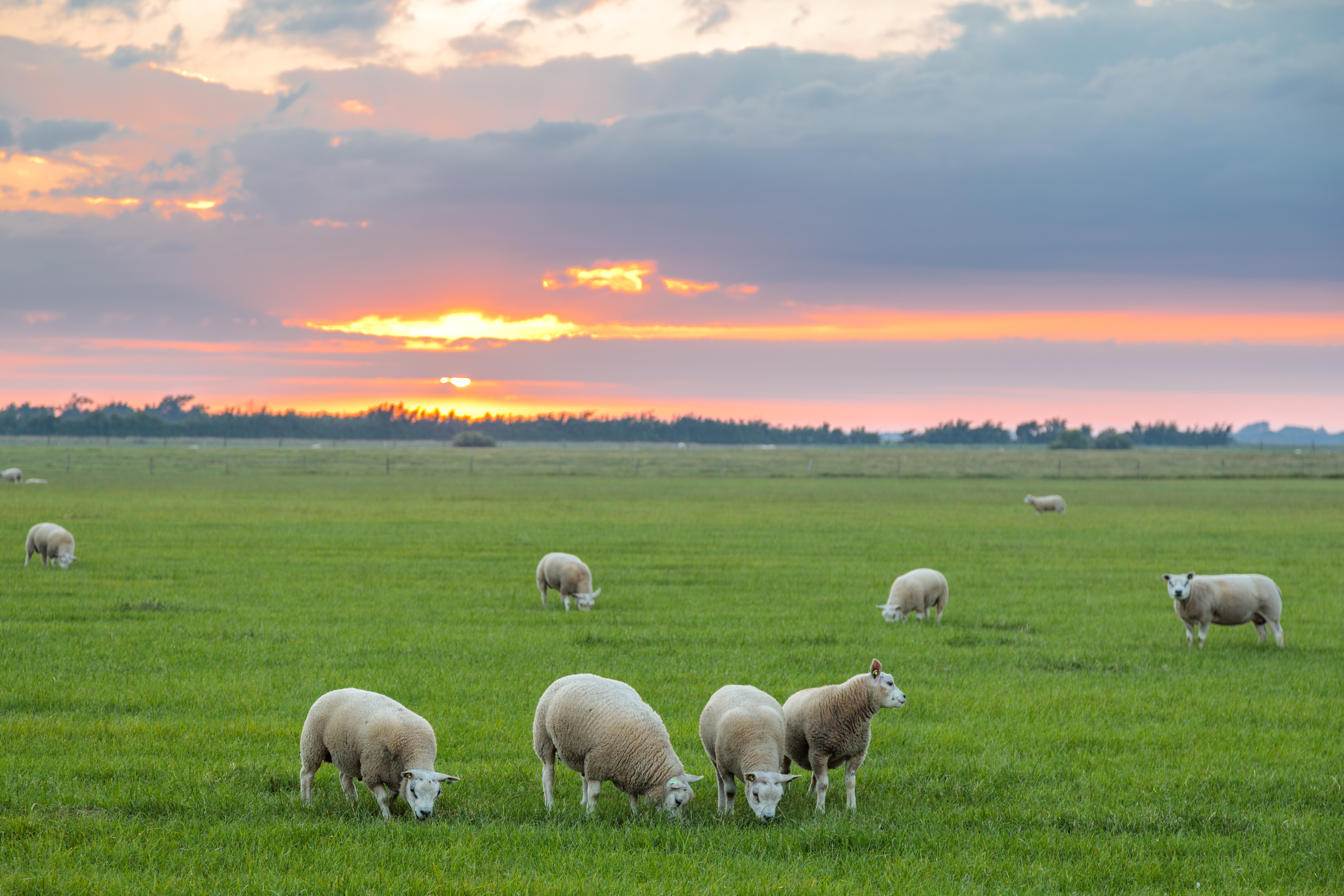
On the island of Texel

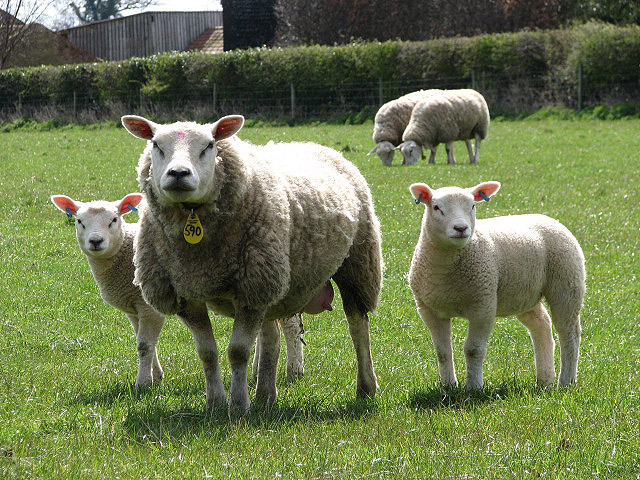
British Texel ewe with twin lambs in Norfolk
