= Exmoor Horn =

Breed of sheep

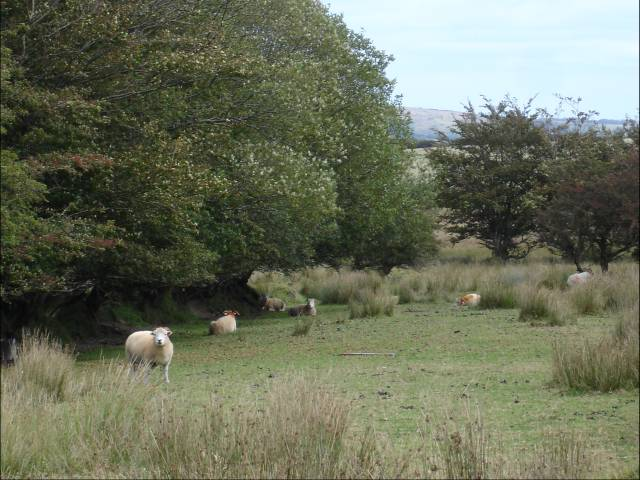
- Exmoor take shelter from the sun under trees
- Country of origin: United Kingdom
- Distribution: Exmoor and Dartmoor
- Use: Wool

Traits
- Weight: Male: 73 kg (160 lb); Female: 50 kg (110 lb)
- Height: Male: 77 cm (30 in); Female: 65 cm (26 in)
- Wool color: White
- Horn status: Rams and ewes are horned

The Exmoor Horn is a white faced, horned breed of sheep. It was developed in Exmoor, Devon, in the 19th century, but is a descendant of sheep that had roamed on the moors for several hundred years.

Research by the Exmoor National Park has found that numbers have gradually declined: it estimates that in 1947 over 27% of sheep in the Somerset part of Exmoor were pure bred Exmoor Horns. As the number of sheep in the region has increased, the percentage has dropped, and today breeding Exmoor Horn ewes represent only about 10% of the total on Exmoor. The National Park reports that there are about 19,000 registered breeding ewes today, of which around 15,000 are on Exmoor. Small numbers are also found on neighbouring Dartmoor.

Exmoors are a hardy breed suited to the high moors. Bred primarily for their wool, the breed is also known for its prolificacy and strong maternal instincts which contribute to the production of quality lamb.
