= Teeswater sheep =

Breed of sheep

Teeswater
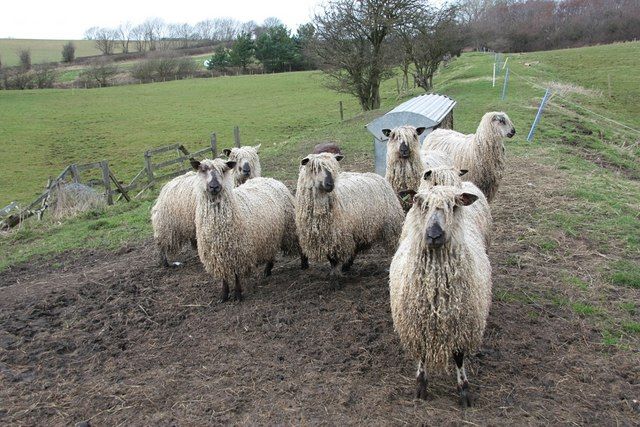
- A small flock of Teeswater sheep, Ingleby Greenhow
- Conservation status: Vulnerable

The Teeswater is a breed of sheep from Teesdale, England. It is a longwool breed that produces a generally large-diameter fibre. However, the animals are raised primarily for meat.

Teeswater sheep have been bred in northern England for about two hundred years; the breed was rare by the 1920s, but has seen a renaissance since World War II. The Rare Breeds Survival Trust has categorised the breed as "at risk".

The Teeswater Sheep Breeders' Association was formed in 1949 with the aim to encourage and improve the breeding of Teeswater sheep; to maintain their purity and particularly to establish the supremacy of Teeswater rams for crossing with hill sheep of other breeds for the production of half-bred lambs.

== Characteristics ==
The wool of the Teeswater should be fine, long-stapled with high lustre with each lock hanging free and with no tendency to felt. There should be no dark fibres in the fleece, which should be uniform in texture over the whole body. The Teeswater produces a kemp free fleece, a characteristic it passes on.

John Claudius Loudon's "An Encyclopaedia of Agriculture" of 1825 describes the breed as:

The Teeswater sheep differ from the Lincolnshire in their wool not being so long and heavy; in standing upon higher, though finer boned legs, supporting a thicker, firmer and heavier carcase, much wider upon their backs and sides; and in affording a fatter and finer grained carcase of mutton...
