= Mule (sheep) =

Hybrid of meat ram / hardy mountain ewe

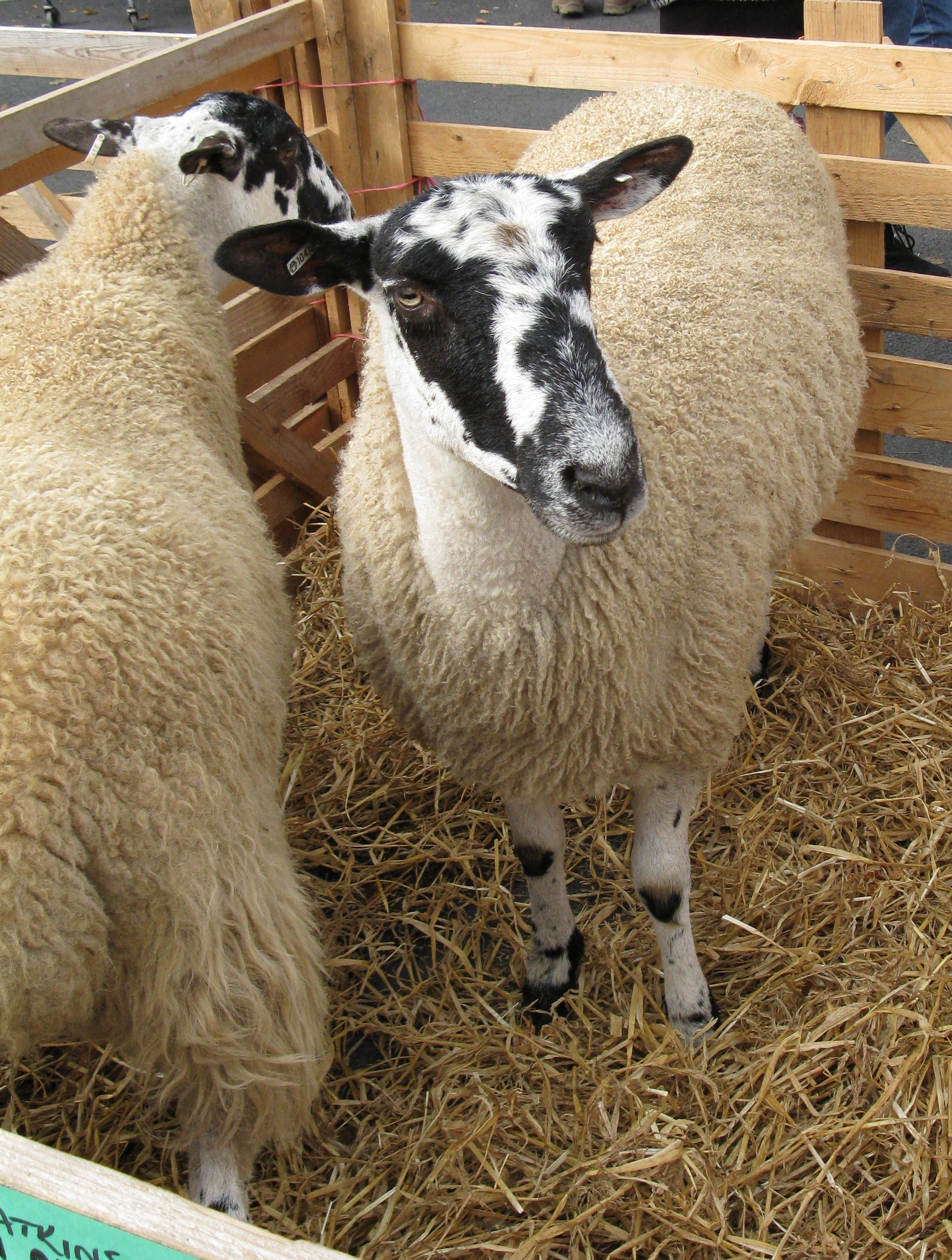
Mule Sheep taken in 2010

In sheep farming, the term mule is used to refer to a cross between a Bluefaced Leicester ram and a purebred hill (or mountain) ewe (usually a Swaledale sheep).

The production of such mule ewes is a widely used breeding management system which offers several advantages to the farmer. Cross breeding the hill ewe with the lowland ram brings about hybrid vigour or heterosis, which brings the best characteristics of both breeds into one ewe that can be used in producing lamb for the table. The hill ewe, for example the Scottish Blackface, is a hardy animal with good, natural mothering instincts. She is, however, not very prolific and tends to produce one lamb: suited to the harsh conditions. The lowland ram, such as the Blueface Leicester is prolific, producing ewes which give 1-3 lambs and capable of producing enough milk to rear them. The cross between the two, in this case the Scottish mule, has good mothering instincts, good sized lambs and prolific milk production.

This mule is usually crossed with a meat-type ram, such as the Suffolk or Texel, to produce these market lambs. This breeding also allows a convenient system of management whereby hill ewes can be reared in difficult areas where other species would not survive to produce lamb. At the end of her productive life (around 4 years) she can be moved to a lowland farm and crossed with the Blueface Leicester or a similar breed to produce the mules for market lamb production.

== Types ==
- North of England or North Country Mule: a blue faced Leicester ram with a Swaledale dam.
- Scotch Mule: a blue faced Leicester ram with a Scottish Blackface dam.
- Welsh Mule: a blue faced Leicester ram with a Welsh Mountain, Beulah or Welsh Hill Speckled-face dam.
- Clun Mule: a blue faced Leicester ram with a Clun Forest dam.
- Cheviot Mule: a blue faced Leicester ram with a Cheviot dam.
- Black Mule: a blue faced Leicester ram with a Jacob sheep dam.
- Mayo Mule: a blue faced Leicester ram with a Mayo Blackface dam.
