= List of North American sheep breeds =

This is a list of sheep breeds usually considered to originate in Canada and the United States. Some may have complex or obscure histories, so inclusion here does not necessarily imply that a breed is predominantly or exclusively from those countries.

Name	Notes	Conservation status	Image
Agnis		FAO (2007): no data	
American Blackbelly		FAO (2007): not listed	
American Jacob			
American Karakul			
American Merino		FAO (2007): no data	
American Tunis			
Ancon		FAO (2007): extinct	
Bell Multi-nippled		FAO (2007): extinct	
California Red		FAO (2007): no data	
California Variegated Mutant		FAO (2007): no data	
Canadian Arcott		FAO (2007): endangered	
Canadian Corriedale		FAO (2007): endangered	
Columbia; Columbia-Southdale		FAO (2007): no data	
Debouillet		FAO (2007): no data	
Delaine Merino			
DLS		FAO (2007): endangered	
Gulf Coast Native			
Hawaiian Black Buck		FAO (2007): no data	
Hog Island		FAO (2007): critical	
Imperial		FAO (2007): extinct	
Katahdin			
Louisiana Native		FAO (2007): no data	
Montadale			
Navajo-Churro			
Newfoundland		FAO (2007): critical	
Outaouais Arcott		FAO (2007): endangered	
Panama		FAO (2007): no data	
Polled Dorset			
Polypay			
Rideau Arcott		FAO (2007): endangered	
Romeldale		FAO (2007): no data	
Romnelet		FAO (2007): no data	
St. Croix			
Santa Cruz			
Stone's Sheep		FAO (2007): no data	
Targhee			
Warhill			
Willamette		FAO (2007): no data	
