= List of Brazilian sheep breeds =

This is a list of the sheep breeds considered in Brazil to be wholly or partly of Brazilian origin. Some may have complex or obscure histories, so inclusion here does not necessarily imply that a breed is predominantly or exclusively Brazilian.

Approximately twenty-three breeds of sheep are reported by Brazil. They are classified either as "naturalised" or as "exotic".

== Naturalised breeds ==
Local name(s)	English name, if used	Notes	Image
Bergamácia Brasileira		derived from the Italian Bergamasca	
	Black Belly		
Somális Brasileira	Brazilian Somali		
Cariri			
Criolla Lanada			
Damara			
Sabugi			
Morada Nova			
Pantaneiro			
Rabo Largo			
Santa Inês			

== Exotic breeds ==
- Australian Merino
- Border Leicester
- Corriedale
- Dorper
- Hampshire Down
- Ideal
- Île-de-France
- Karakul
- Lacaune
- Poll Dorset
- Polypay
- Romney Marsh
- Suffolk
- Texel
