= American Rambouillet =

American breed of sheep

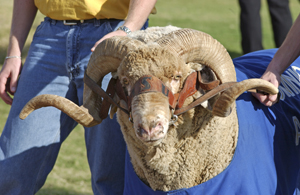
- A ram
- Conservation status: DAD-IS (2026): at risk/endangered-maintained
- Other names: Rambouillet
- Country of origin: United States
- Use: meat, wool

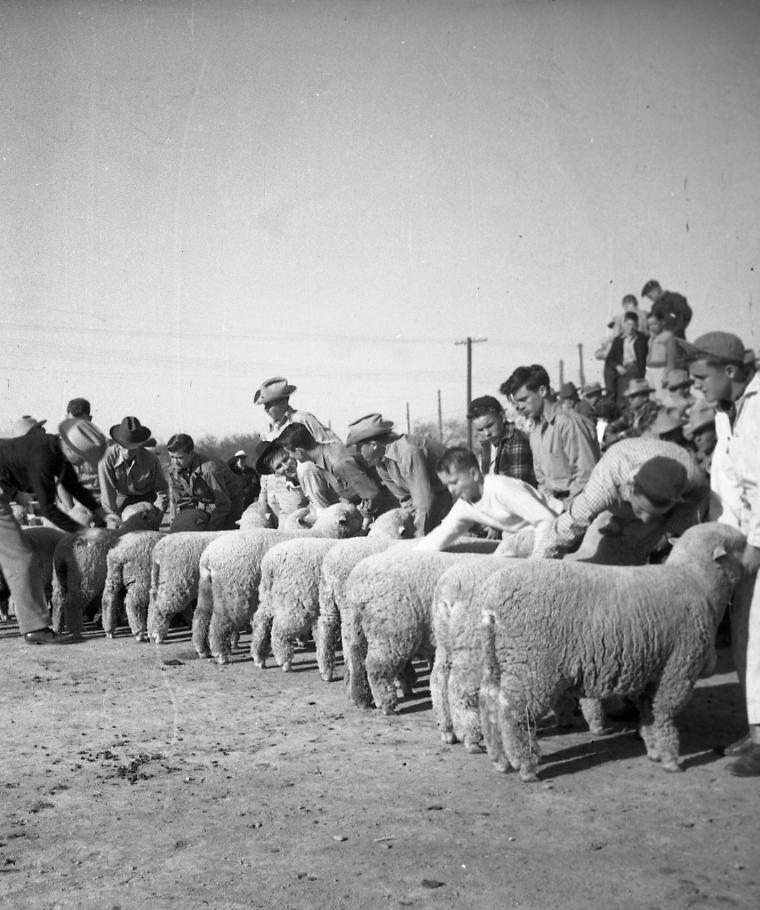
Ewe lambs in Texas in 1946

The American Rambouillet is an American breed of Merino sheep. It derives from the historic Rambouillet of France. It is a mixed-use breed, raised by farmers for both its wool and its meat. It is most commonly raised in Western North America, where its strong flocking instinct helps protect flocks from predators such as coyotes. It is one of several American merino breeds; others are the American Merino, the Delaine Merino and the extinct Vermont Merino.

A polled variety, the Polled Rambouillet, is sometimes reported as a separate breed.

== History ==
Stock of the historic French Rambouillet was imported to the USA between about 1840 and 1860 from France, and then from Germany between about 1882 and 1900.

In 1889 a breed society, the Rambouillet Association, was formed by Larmon Bronson Townsend and Larmon George Townsend in Ionia, Michigan, with the aim of managing the breed. A 1989 book estimated that 50% of the sheep on the US western ranges include at least some Rambouillet descent.

Despite their French origins, Rambouillet and half-Rambouillet crossbreeds are most commonly raised in Western North America, for a variety of reasons. Western North America favors external grazing in large, somewhat dry areas where predators such as coyotes are a threat. This makes it less suitable for rapid-growing meat sheep with weaker flocking instincts that can wander afield. The Rambouillet's hardiness aids in an arid environment and their strong flocking instinct helps deter predators. As the importance of wool has fallen, a common adaptation has been to keep purebred Rambouillet ewes as a longer-lived breeding flock, and then using meat-favoring rams (such as Suffolk sheep) for a proportion of the herd and sending the crossbred lambs to market as meat.

The American Rambouillet has contributed to the development of a number of other breeds, among them the Debouillet (crossed with Delaine Merino); the Columbia and the extinct Panama (from crosses with Lincoln Longwool); and the American Blackbelly or Barbado (from crosses with Barbados Blackbelly and Corsican mouflon.

== Characteristics ==
The American Rambouillet is somewhat larger than the Spanish Merino, and the largest of all finewool sheep. Body weights for full-grown animals are commonly in the range 65 to 80 kg for ewes and 90 to 135 kg for rams.

Rams may be naturally polled or horned, while ewes are always polled; the polled variety is sometimes reported as a separate breed, the Polled Rambouillet. It seems that the trait for being polled is a dominant gene. They enter puberty and sexual maturity somewhat later than other breeds of sheep, and usually are lambed in their second year. The gestation period for a pregnant ewe is around 150 days.

== Uses ==
The breed is dual-use and is reared both for wool and for meat.

Ewe fleeces usually weigh from 4.5 to 7 kg greasy; the staple length is generally in the range 60–100 mm, with a fineness of 19–24 μm (Bradford Count approximately 62s–70s).
