= Merinizzata Italiana =

Breed of sheep

- Country of origin: Italy
- Distribution: southern and central Italy
- Use: dual-purpose, meat and wool

Traits
- Weight: Male: 70 kg; Female: 55 kg
- Height: Male: 79 cm; Female: 69 cm
- Skin colour: unpigmented
- Wool colour: white
- Face colour: white
- Horn status: polled

The Merinizzata Italiana is a modern Italian breed of dual-purpose sheep from southern Italy. It was created in the twentieth century by cross-breeding local Italian stock with imported Merino breeds from France and Germany. It is reared in central and southern Italy, principally in Abruzzo.

== History ==
The Merinizzata Italiana is a modern breed, created over several decades in the twentieth century by cross-breeding of indigenous Gentile di Puglia and Sopravissana stock with imported Merino breeds such as the French Berrichon du Cher and Île-de-France, and the German Merinolandschaf. The aim was to produce a good meat breed without sacrificing wool quality.

It is reared mainly in the southern and central Italian regions of Abruzzo, Basilicata, Calabria, Campania, Lazio, the Marche, Molise, Puglia and Umbria. It is one of the seventeen autochthonous Italian sheep breeds for which a genealogical herd-book is kept by the Associazione Nazionale della Pastorizia, the Italian national association of sheep-breeders.

Total numbers for the breed were estimated in the year 2000 at 600000 head, of which 19000 were registered in the herd-book; in 2013 the number recorded in the herd-book was 27260.

== Characteristics ==
It is of medium to large size and weight: rams weigh on average 70 kg and stand some 79 cm, while ewes average 55 kg in weight and 69 cm in height. The fleece and face are both white, and the skin is unpigmented; the fleece covers the whole body, extending far down the legs and sometimes onto the cheeks and forehead. Both sexes are naturally polled (without horns).

== Use ==
Lambs are usually weaned at 6–7 weeks, and slaughtered soon after, at a weight of 10–15 kg. Rams yield about 4.5 kg of wool, ewes about 2.5 kg; the wool is of good quality, with a fibre diameter of 18–26 microns.
