= Barbarine (disambiguation) =

Barbarine may refer to:

- the Barbarine, a rock formation in the German part of the Elbe Sandstone Mountains
- the Tunisian Barbarin, a Tunisian breed of fat-tailed sheep

== See also ==
- Barbarin (disambiguation)
