= Delaine =

Delaine may refer to:

- Delaine Buses, bus operator in Lincolnshire, England
- Delaine (cloth), a kind of mixed cloth.
- Delaine Merino, type of sheep
- Emma Delaine (born 2003), French rhythmic gymnast
- Thomas Delaine, French football player
- Phillip DeLaine, politician in Ohio, United States
