= Barbarin =

Barbarin may refer to:

- Barbarin, Navarre, a town in Navarre, Spain
- the Tunisian Barbarin, a Tunisian breed of fat-tailed sheep
- The natural plant constituent 5-phenyl-1,3-oxazolidine-2-thione, a breakdown product of a glucosinolate and named from its first isolation from the plant Barbarea vulgaris R. Br.

See also:

- Barbarin (surname)
