= Trimeticcia di Segezia =

Italian breed of sheep

- Conservation status: FAO (2007): endangered; DAD-IS (2023); at risk/critical
- Country of origin: Italy

Traits
- Weight: Male: 65–70 kg; Female: 60–70 kg
- Wool colour: white
- Face colour: white

Notes
- triple-purpose – meat, milk and wool

The Trimeticcia di Segezia is a modern breed of domestic sheep from Puglia in southern Italy. It is named for the town of Segezia, a frazione of Foggia, where it was created at the Istituto Sperimentale per la Zootecnia, an experimental breeding station of the Ministero delle Politiche Agricole, Alimentari e Forestali, the Italian ministry of agriculture. "Trimeticcia" means "three-way hybrid": the breed was created by cross-breeding Gentile di Puglia ewes with French Île-de-France rams, and then crossing the resultant hybrid with Württemberger rams; the resulting stock was selectively bred for adaptation to the climate and conditions of the area. The range of the breed is principally the plain of the Tavoliere delle Puglie, but extends also into Molise. The Trimeticcia di Segezia is one of the forty-two autochthonous local sheep breeds of limited distribution for which a herd-book is kept by the Associazione Nazionale della Pastorizia, the Italian national association of sheep-breeders.

In 1983 there were about 4000 head. In 2013 no total number for the breed was recorded in the herd-book. In 2023 a population of 188 was reported to DAD-IS;for 2022 the reported population was 97 head – 92 ewes and 5 rams.
