= Santa Inês sheep =

Brazilian breed of sheep

Santa Inês
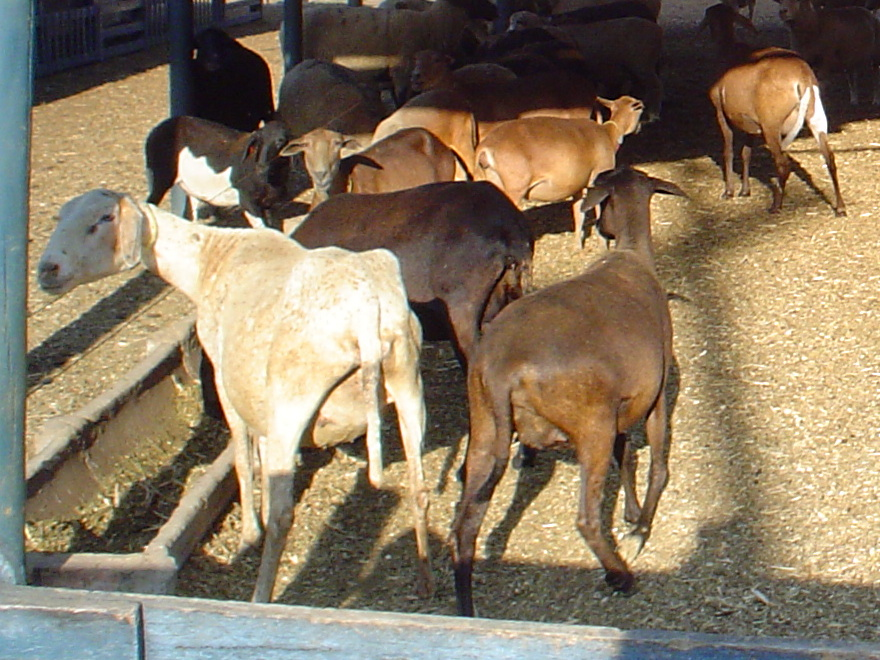

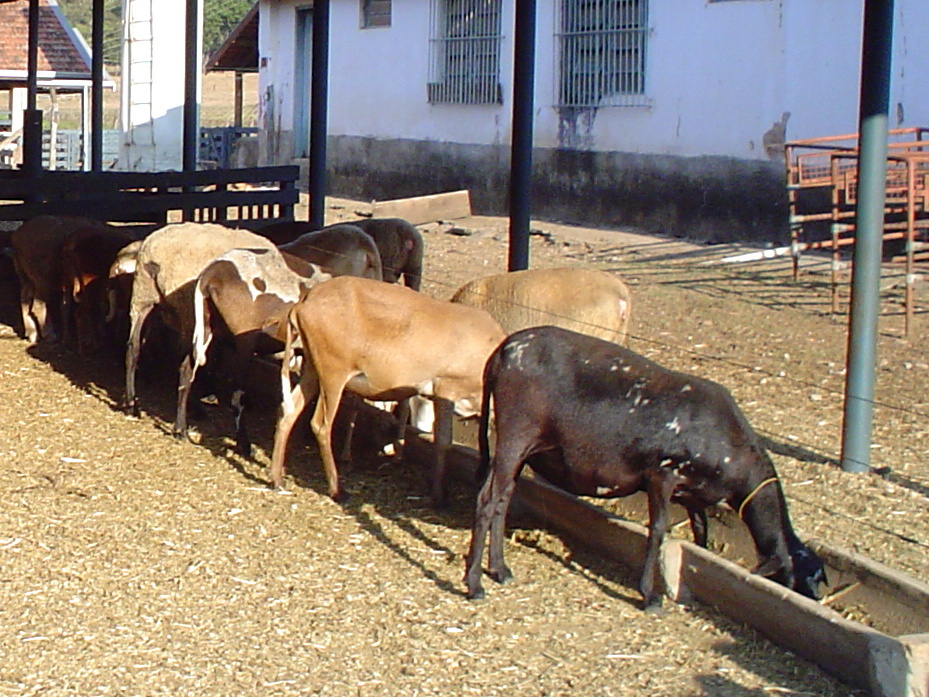
- Conservation status: FAO (2007): not at risk; DAD-IS (2026): not at risk
- Other names: Pelo de Boi de Bahia
- Country of origin: Brazil
- Distribution: Bolivia; Malaysia; Paraguay; Uruguay

Traits
- Weight: Male: 100 kg; Female: 75 kg
- Height: Male: 65 cm; Female: 60 cm
- Horn status: polled

The Santa Inês is a Brazilian breed of domestic sheep. It is a hair sheep, growing hair rather than wool, and is reared both for meat and for hides.

It is the principal hair sheep breed of the country, and is larger and faster-growing than either of the other two important hair sheep breeds of north-eastern Brazil, the Brazilian Somali and the Morada Nova.

It was bred in the 1940s in Bahia State, in north-eastern Brazil, but its exact origins are not clear. It has a greater resistance to infection by gastrointestinal nematodes than European meat breeds such as the Île-de-France and the Suffolk.

== History ==
The Santa Inês was bred in the 1940s in Bahia State, in north-eastern Brazil. Its origins remain unclear. It was formerly thought that it derived from cross-breeding of the Italian Bergamasca with a local sheep of Crioula type such as the Rabo Largo, possibly with some contribution from the Morada Nova or from hair sheep of African origin; modern studies suggest that this history may be incomplete or incorrect.

A herd-book was established in 1977. In 2022 there were approximately 120000 of the sheep, with about 40000 rams and 80000 ewes. The conservation status of the breed was listed as "not at risk" both by the Food and Agriculture Organization of the United Nations in 2007 and in the DAD-IS database in 2026.

== Characteristics ==
The Santa Inês is larger and faster-growing than either of the other two important hair sheep breeds of north-eastern Brazil, the Brazilian Somali and the Morada Nova. Body weights are variously reported as 100 kg for rams and 75 kg for ewes, or as 70 kg and 40–50 kg respectively; the corresponding average heights at the withers are 65 cm and 60 cm.

It is a hair sheep, growing hair rather than wool, and is polled and lop-eared. The colour of the coat is variable, and may be black, white or red; pied and spotted patterns are seen.

It has a greater resistance to infection by gastrointestinal nematodes than European meat breeds such as the Île-de-France and the Suffolk.

== Use ==
The Santa Inês is reared both for meat and for hides.
