= California Red sheep =

Breed of sheep

California Red
- Country of origin: United States
- Distribution: Canada, United States
- Standard: California Red Sheep Registry, Inc.

Traits
- Weight: Male: 180 pounds (82kg); Female: 130 pounds (59kg)
- Skin color: Red
- Face color: Red
- Horn status: Hornless

The California Red is a breed of domestic sheep developed in the United States.

It is so named because its lambs are born all red, and retain this color in their faces and limbs into adulthood. In the early 1970s, Dr. Glenn Spurlock of Davis, California crossed Tunis sheep and Barbados Blackbelly sheep, and the California Red is consequently a dual-purpose breed with many of the qualities of its forebears, the out-of season breeding qualities and fleece of the Tunis and the heat tolerance and carcase quality of the Blackbelly. Spurlock actually set out to create a new hair sheep like the Barbados Blackbelly, but though he failed to do so — California Reds have reddish tan hairs intermingled with white wool — he and other breeders continued to develop the strain anyway.

The California Red can lamb out of season, thus being able to produce multiple lamb crops in a year. It also functions well in hot weather, and is polled in both sexes.

== History ==
In the early 1970s, Dr. Glenn Spurlock of Davis, California attempted to create a large-framed shape that did not grow wool by crossing Tunis and Barbados sheep. While his efforts did not come to fruition, he did develop a red-colored sheep that eventually came into the possession of Aime and Paulette Soulier of Winters, California. With the help of other sheep breeders, the Souliers were able to grow and develop the breed, with over 2,200 sheep registered since.

== Characteristics ==
The California Red is a medium-size sheep, with rams weighing between 180 and 250 pounds (82 and 113 kg) and ewes between 130 and 140 pounds (59 and 64 kg). They have a bold, strong expression framed by a chiseled muzzle and long, pendulous ears. The animals are polled. The face and legs are free of wool, and the fur covering them ranges in color from gold to a dark cinnamon. Lambs have reddish-brown wool when they are born, but this fades as they grow. The wool is silky in texture and of high quality, with a Bradford count of 50 to 60 and a staple length of 3 to 6 in (8 to 15 cm). It is beige or oatmeal in color, and males can sometimes produce a "mane" of red hair.

== Uses ==
California Red wool has found a niche market among hand spinners and weavers. The animals have a tender and flavorful meat.

== Health ==
The California Red Sheep Registry requires their members to test rams for ovine brucellosis (Brucella ovis), a bacterial infection that causes infertility in rams. Registered sheep must also have correct dental/jaw conformation.
