= Canadian Arcott =

Breed of sheep

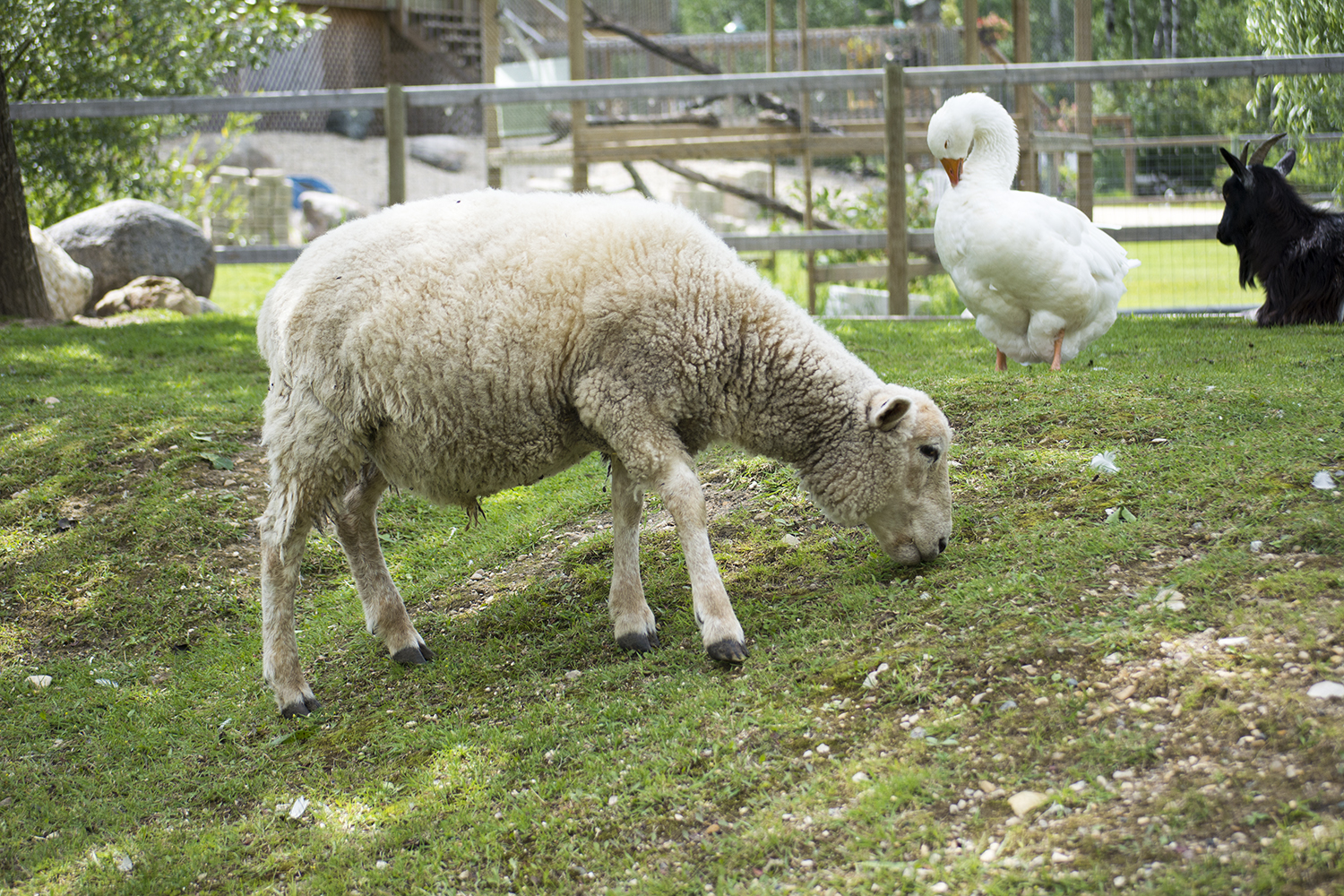
Canadian Arcott sheep

The Canadian Arcott is a breed of domestic sheep native to Canada. The latter half of its name is an acronym for the Animal Research Centre in Ottawa, where it was developed along with the Rideau Arcott and the Outaouais Arcott. This breed was a result of a crossbreeding program of Suffolk (37%), Ile de France (28%), Leicester (14%), North Country Cheviot (7%) and Romnelet (6%); the remaining 8% was contributed from Shropshire, Lincoln, Southdown Dorset, East Friesian, Finnsheep and Corriedale.

This breed was developed to exhibit strong meat characteristics. Mature individuals are medium-sized as well as short and thick. These animals are able to adapt to pasture or confinement systems with ease.

== Physical characteristics ==
Canadian Arcotts have white or mottled faces that are free of winkles and wool. This breed is described as having a soft and lustrous fleece of medium grade. They have heavily muscled legs and a long narrow tail that is covered with wool.

Mature rams typically weigh between 80 and 100 kg; ewes between 75 and 95 kg, lambs weigh 4 kg when born and reach a market weight of 37 kg at 118 days of age.

== Reproduction ==
Ewes reach sexual maturity at 230 days old and weigh approximately 49 kg. Ewes lamb at eight-month intervals in February and October; the length of gestation is typically 147 days. About 65% of ewes produce multiple births.

Ewes lamb without difficulty. Lambs grow at rapid rates and produce excellent carcass meat.

Rams are used in many breeding programs to improve the meat characteristics of other breeds.

== See also ==
- List of sheep breeds
