= Barbarin (surname) =

Barbarin is a surname. Notable people with the surname include:

- Imani Barbarin (born 1990), American writer and disability rights activist
- Oscar Anthony Barbarin, clinical psychologist and academic
- Paul Jean Joseph Barbarin (1855–1931), French mathematician
- Philippe Barbarin, Archbishop emeritus of Lyon, France, and Cardinal of the Catholic Church
- Members of the musical Barbarin family
  - Isidore Barbarin (1871–1960), New Orleans jazz cornet and alto horn player and bandleader, father of Paul and Louis, grandfather of Danny Barker, great-grandfather of Lucien
  - Lucien Barbarin (1956–2020), New Orleans trombone player
  - Paul Barbarin (1899–1969), New Orleans jazz drummer
  - Louis Barbarin (1902–1997), New Orleans jazz drummer
