= Gentile di Puglia =

Italian breed of sheep

- Conservation status: FAO (2007): not at risk
- Other names: Merinos d'Italia
- Country of origin: Italy
- Distribution: Puglia and neighbouring regions
- Standard: MIPAAF
- Use: wool

Traits
- Weight: Male: 67 kg; Female: 43 kg
- Height: Male: 71 cm; Female: 62 cm
- Wool color: white
- Face color: white
- Horn status: males horned, females usually hornless

The Gentile di Puglia is an Italian breed of domestic sheep indigenous to southern Italy. It originates from the Tavoliere di Foggia, a large plain in the northern part of Puglia, and is raised mainly in that region; a few are found in neighbouring regions. The Gentile di Puglia is sometimes known as the Merinos d'Italia, or Italian Merino.

== History ==
The Gentile di Puglia derives from cross-breeding local ewes with Merino rams brought from Spain, first by Alfonso V of Aragon in the fifteenth century, and later, repeatedly, by the Bourbon kings of Naples, who had extensive estates near Foggia. In the nineteenth century, after the Unification of Italy, there was cross-breeding with imported French Rambouillet and German Merinolandschaf animals, with the aim of further improving the quality of the wool.

The collapse of the wool trade in the later twentieth century caused a sharp fall in number of the breed. Various indiscriminate attempts were made to improve the meat yield by cross-breeding with other types, some of them imported. In the 1980s a study of 10,000 head found 13% to be pure-bred stock. As a result, a controlled cross-breeding and selection programme was started, which led to the creation of the Trimeticcia di Segezia breed.

The Gentile di Puglia is one of the seventeen autochthonous Italian sheep breeds for which a genealogical herdbook is kept by the Associazione Nazionale della Pastorizia, the Italian national association of sheep-breeders. The herdbook was established in 1971. In 1983 total numbers for the breed were estimated at 500,000, of which 31,700 were registered in the herdbook; in 2013 the number recorded in the herdbook was 3532.

== Use ==
The milk yield of the Gentile di Puglia is approximately 80–100 litres per lactation; most of it is taken by the lambs, but it is also used in the production of pecorino cheeses such as the Incanestrato Foggiano di Castel Monte. Lambs are usually slaughtered at 50–60 days, at a weight of 12–15 kg. Rams yield about 6 kg of wool, ewes about 3.5 kg, in a single shearing; the wool is of high quality, with a fibre diameter of 18–22 microns.
