= Gulf Coast Native sheep =

Breed of sheep

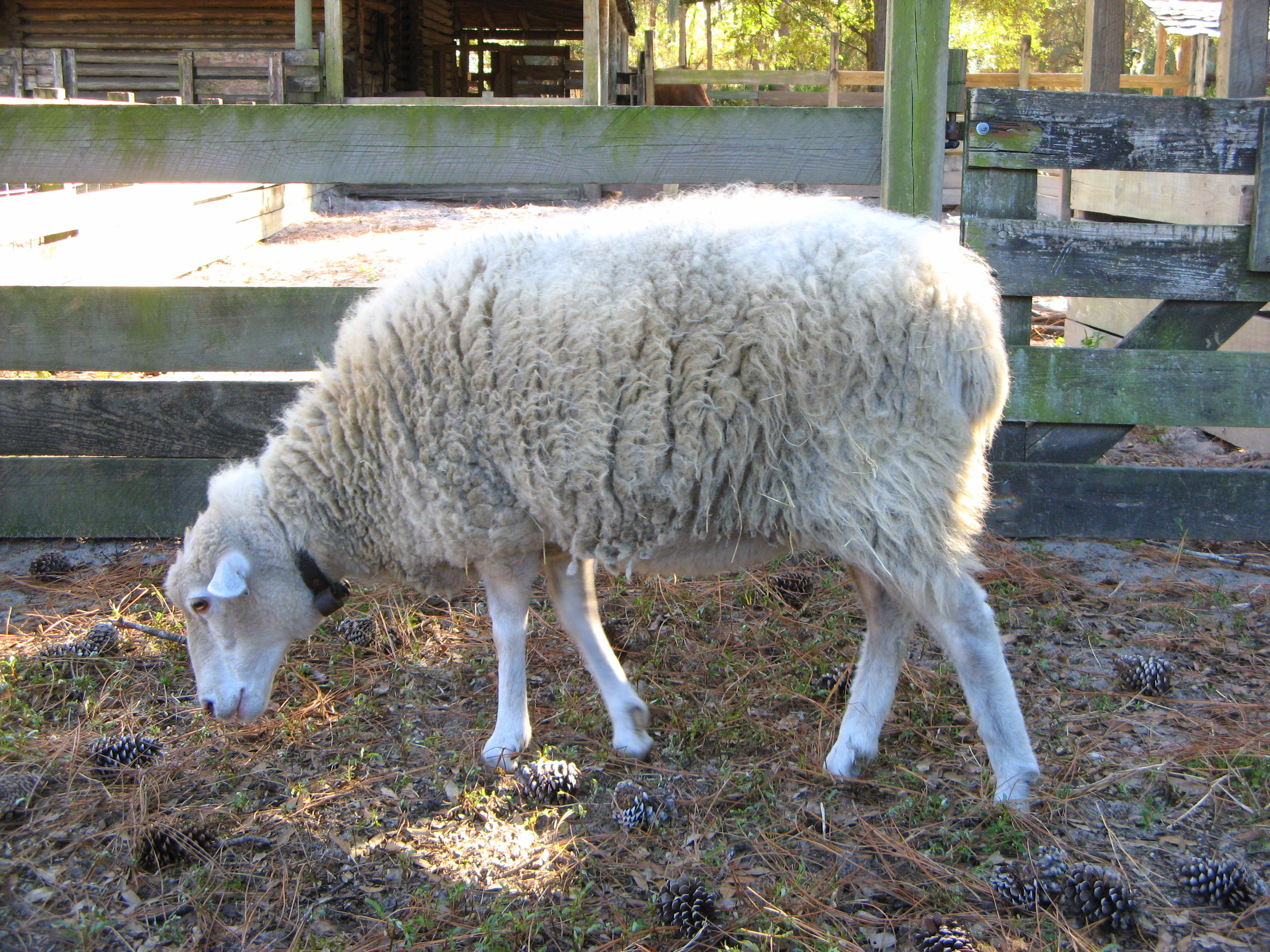
A Gulf Coast Native sheep in Florida

The Gulf Coast Native is a breed of sheep found in the U.S. states bordering the Gulf Coast. Also occasionally known as the Louisiana Scrub, Pineywoods Native or simply Gulf Coast sheep, the breed is a mix of many of the sheep varieties brought to the Southern United States during the European colonization of the region. It is now an exceedingly rare breed, but one valuable for its ability to adapt to the hot humid climate of the Gulf Coast.

== History ==
The bloodlines of Gulf Coast Native sheep can be traced back to the original proliferation of Churra sheep in the New World during the 15th century by the Spanish. Later, these Criollo-type sheep mixed intermittently with British and French breeds. Some strains may also show Tunis influence.

Thousands of Gulf Coast sheep roamed free range over pastures in the South, except for regular roundups. In an age before modern husbandry methods, these sheep adapted to the climate of the South or perished, breeding in decades of resistance to the conditions of the region. Eventually special strains the breed appeared based on the area, such as for Louisiana, Texas, or Florida.

By the mid 20th century, Gulf Coast Native sheep supplied nearly all the raw wool for the Southern United States and hundreds of thousands of them were in existence. However, post-World War II, deworming medications and other advances were widely introduced to the sheep industry in the United States, meaning more modern breeds with greater production capacity could be introduced to the South. This led to a precipitous decline in the numbers of Gulf Coast Native sheep. Since 1994, there has been a breed association for Gulf Coast Native sheep.

Gulf Coast Native sheep are listed "critical" on the conservation priority list of the American Livestock Breeds Conservancy, and are included in Slow Food USA's Ark of Taste. Research flocks have been kept by the University of Florida, Louisiana State University, and by the USDA Agricultural Research Service in Arkansas. Zoo Atlanta has also acquired a flock.

== Characteristics ==
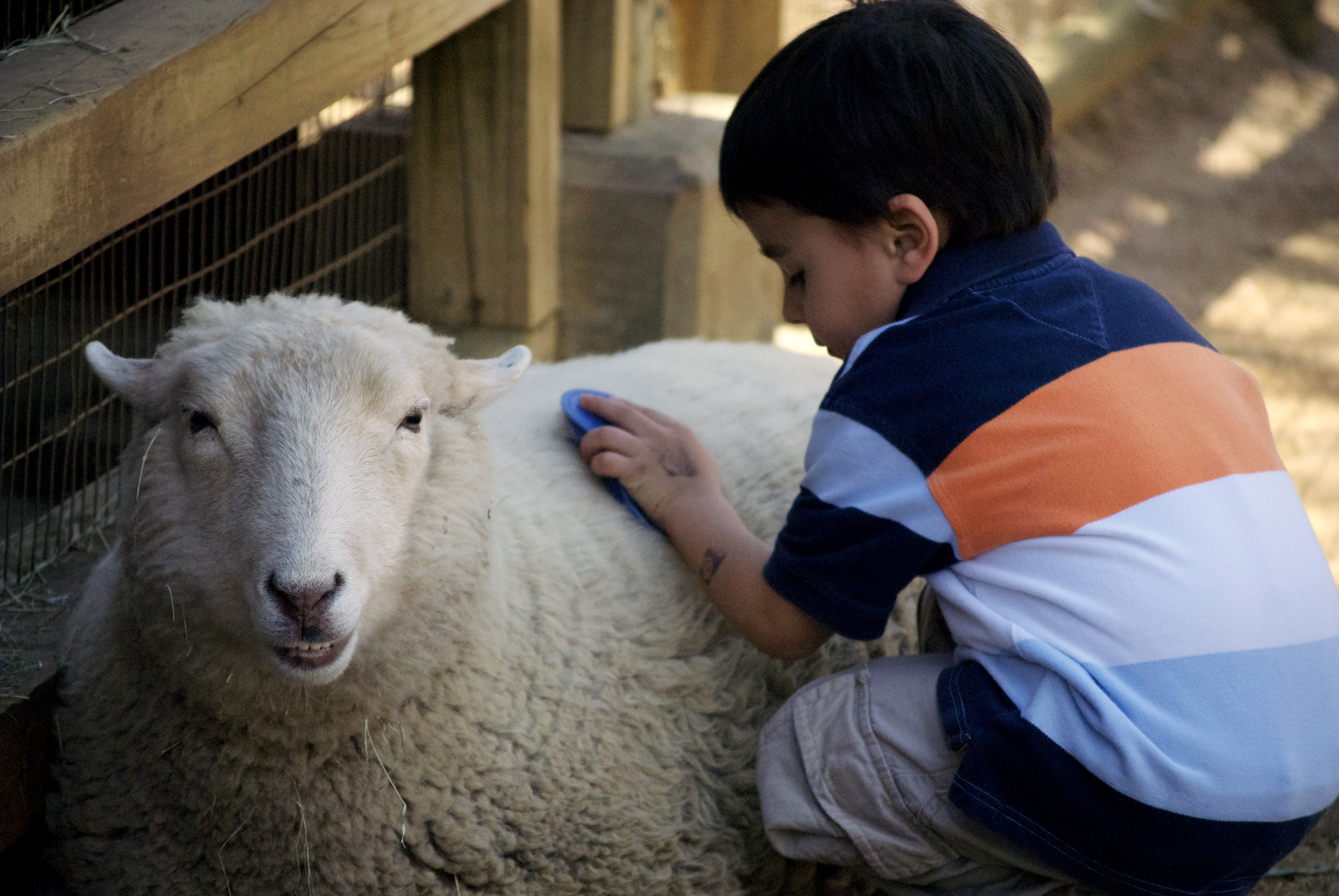
A child pets a Gulf Coast Native at Zoo Atlanta

Gulf Coast Natives are small fine-boned sheep, with ewes weighing no more than 180 pounds and rams 200. They are often much smaller, especially on poor grazing land. They may be polled or horned in both sexes. Though primarily a meat breed, Gulf Coast Natives carry a light wool that may have some hair in it, with a staple of 2.5-4 inches long. It is usually white, but may be brown, black, or spotted occasionally. Gulf Coast sheep do not have wool on their faces, bellies or legs, which is an adaptation to the heat of the South.

The most notable characteristic of Gulf Coast Native sheep is its resistance to parasites and diseases that flourish among sheep in hot humid climates. Compared to other breeds, they are especially known for their ability to resist foot rot (Fusobacterium) and the dreaded Haemonchus contortus which are both more common in warmer climates.
