= Rideau Arcott =

Breed of sheep

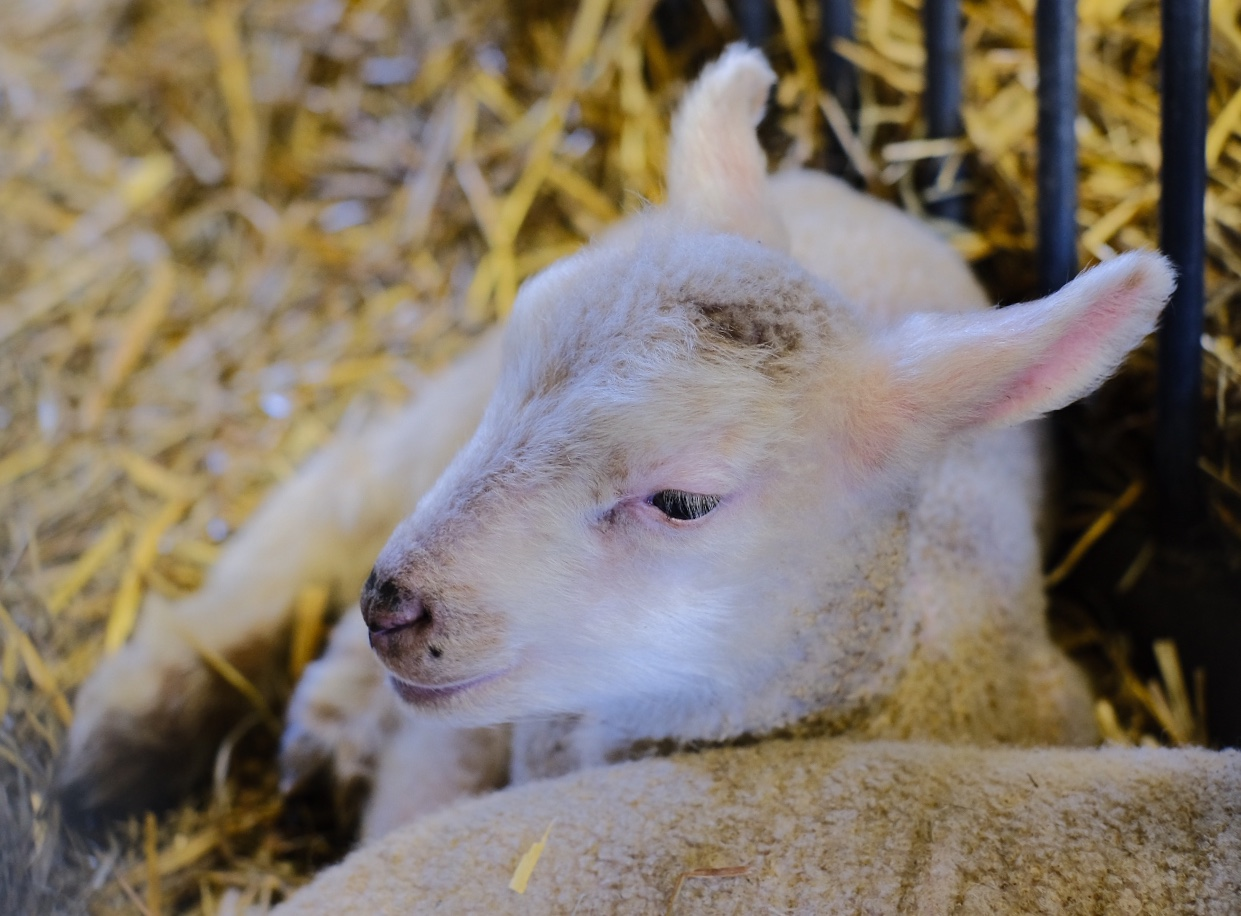

The Rideau Arcott is a breed of domestic sheep native to Canada, one of only a few livestock breeds native to the country.

== History ==
The Rideau Arcott was produced from a breeding program that was created in 1966 by Agriculture Canada’s Animal Research Centre in Ottawa; other breeds that were produced from the same program include the Canadian Arcott and the Outaouais Arcott. The goal when creating the Rideau Arcott was to create a breed of sheep that produced multiple offspring rapidly. They introduced new technologies in quantitative genetics, reproductive physiology, nutrition and housing that allowed them to select for the traits they wanted to be expressed in the breed. The research flock was closed in 1974, and the breed was distributed to shepherds beginning in 1988.

The Rideau name is a common one in Ottawa. The latter half of its name is an acronym for the Animal Research Centre in Ottawa.

One of only a few livestock breeds developed in Canada, the Rideau is a synthesis of many different breeds. The breed is genetically 40% Finnish Landrace, 20% Suffolk, 14% East Friesian, 9% Shropshire and 8% Dorset Horn; the remaining 9% is Border Leicester, North Country Cheviot, Romnelet and Corriedale. The Rideau Arcott has been selectively bred for higher fertility, multiple births, milk production and growth rate.

Rideaus exhibit strong maternal traits, making them a popular choice for crossbreeding as they typically produce twins or triplets. Crossbreeding with Rideau rams is said to quickly increase lambing rates to 180 percent or more.

== Characteristics ==
The Rideau Arcott is a large sheep with a rapid growth rate. it is generally white, but some animals have slightly coloured legs. The face is white and free of wool, but a few dark patches sometimes occur. This breed is naturally polled but some rams may develop horny protuberances. Rams weigh up to 100 kilograms (220 lb) and ewes range between 70 and 90 kilograms (150 and 200 lb). The breed is primarily kept for meat, but does also produce a medium-quality fleece.

This breed is very prolific. Lambing can occur at intervals of eight months and ewe lambs can be put to the tup at seven months to lamb for the first time at a year old. These ewe lambs have a lambing rate of 180 percent, and mature ewes produce 40 percent twins and 50 percent triplets.

== See also ==
- List of sheep breeds
