= Delaine (cloth) =

Kind of mixed cloth

Delaine (de laine, Muslin de Laine, Mousseline de Laine) was a kind of mixed cloth with cotton warp threads and wool weft threads. Delaine may be made of undyed yarns, or be printed or piece dyed. Delaine cloth was used in the manufacture women's dresses that were traded in the nineteenth century under many names to suit importers and traders.

== Etymology ==
Delaine (de laine), Muslin de Laine, and Mousseline de Laine are all French words for wool cloth. Delaine is also called "chaine cotton" in French, which means "cotton warp", and sometimes mi-laine, which means "half wool".

== Fabric structure ==
Delaines were woven using cotton warp and worsted filling. It was a kind of plain thin fabric.

=== Delaine wool ===
Delaine wool grades were specified for delain cloth; they were strong and fine with a 3-inch length.

=== Dyeing of Delaine ===
Due to the origins of cotton and wool fibers, cotton and wool have different dye affinities; solid colors in delaines were difficult to achieve. When delaine colors were mixed in an inept manner, the cotton and wool colors were drastically different, resulting in the "threadiness" impression.

=== Variations ===
Delaines were also produced using a silk warp and a wool weft, as well as entirely of wool.

== Use ==
Delaines were used in blouses and various ladies' dresses. They were printed for summer clothing material between 1830 and 1840.

== See also ==
- Delaine Merino
- Muslin
