= Paul Jean Joseph Barbarin =

French mathematician (1855–1931)

- Born: 20 October 1855; Tarbes, Hautes-Pyrénées, Occitania, France
- Died: 28 September 1931 (aged 75)
- Education: École polytechnique École normale supérieure
- Occupation: Mathematician

Paul Jean Joseph Barbarin (20 October 1855, Tarbes – 28 September 1931) was a French mathematician, specializing in geometry.

== Education and career ==
Barbarin studied mathematics for a brief time at the École Polytechnique, but changed, at the age of 19 1/2, to the École Normale Supérieure, where he studied mathematics under Briot, Bouquet, Tannery, and Darboux. After graduation, Barbarin became a professor of mathematics at the Lyceum of Nice and then at the School of St.-Cyr of the Lyceum of Toulon. In 1891 he became a professor at the Lyceum of Bordeaux, where he taught for many years. At the time of his death he was a professor at the École Spéciale des Travaux Publics in Paris.

In 1903 the Kazan Physical and Mathematical Society of Kazan State University awarded the Lobachevsky Prize to Hilbert but the Society cited Barbarin as the second choice among the nominees considered. When Hilbert received the Society's award, Henri Poincaré contributed a report on the work of Hilbert, and Professor Mansion of Ghent contributed a report on the work of Barbarin. In a 1904 article published in the journal Science, G. B. Halsted gave an English summary of the two French reports.

Athanase Papadopoulos edited and translated Lobachevsky's Pangéométrie ou Précis de géométrie fondée sur une théorie générale et rigoureuse des parallèles (Pangeometry) and provided a footnote concerning Barbarin:

P. Barbarin, La géométrie non euclidienne ... This is an excellent introductory textbook on hyperbolic geometry, although it presents some of the results without complete proofs. The book also contains interesting historical remarks. The third edition of the book (1928) contains supplementary chapters by A. Buhl on the relation between non-Euclidean geometry and physics. ... Barbarin was a high-school teacher in Bordeaux. We owe him several results on hyperbolic geometry, in particular, the first complete classification of conics and quadrics in the non-Euclidean plane, and new formulae for volumes of tetrahedra.

Barbarin was an Invited Speaker of the ICM in 1928 in Bologna.

== Selected publications ==
=== Articles ===
- "Note sur le planimètre polaire." Nouvelles annales de mathématiques: journal des candidats aux écoles polytechnique et normale 19 (1880): 212–215.
- "Note sur les coordonnées bipolaires." Nouvelles annales de mathématiques: journal des candidats aux écoles polytechnique et normale 1 (1882): 15–28.
- Sur le droite de Simson. Mathesis 2 (1882) Part I, 106–108, Part II, 122–129. (See Robert Simson.)
- Note sur l'herpolhodie. Nouvelles annales de mathématiques: journal des candidats aux écoles polytechnique et normale 4 (1885): 538–556.
- Systèmes isogonaux du triangle. Association française pour l'avancement des sciences 2 (1896) 89–105.
- Triangles dont les bissectrices ont des longueurs données. Mathesis 16 (1896) 143–150.
- Une généralisation de théorème de Joachimstal Revue de mathématiques spéciales 4 (1897) 353–354. (See Ferdinand Joachimstal.)
- Constructions sphériques a la règle et au compas. Mathesis 19 (1899) Part I, 57–60, Part II, 81–85.
- On the Utility of Studying Non-Euclidean Geometry. The American Mathematical Monthly 8, no. 8/9 (1901) 161–163. (trans. by G. B. Halsted)
- Le cinquième livre de la Métagéométrie Mathesis 21 (1901) 177–191.
- Bilatères et trilatères en Metagéométrie Mathesis 22 (1902) 187–193.
- Les cosegments et les volumes en géométrie non euclidienne. Mémoires de la Société des sciences physiques et naturelles de Bordeaux, série 6, tome 2 (1902) 25–44.
- Polygones réguliers sphériques et non-euclidiens. Le matematiche pure ed applicate 2 (1902) 137–145.
- Calculs abrégés de sinus et cosinus circulaires ou hyperboliques Mémoires de la Société des sciences physiques et naturelles de Bordeaux, série 6, tome 2 (1904) 163–188.

=== Books ===
- Études de géométrie analytique non euclidienne. Bruxelles. 1900.
- Géométrie infinitésimal non euclidienne. Lisbonne. 1901.
- Barbarin, Paul (1902). La géométrie non euclidienne. Paris. deuxième édition. Scientia. [Serie] physico-mathematique; no 15. Gauthier-Villars. 1907. troisième édition. 1928; notes détaillées par Adolphe Buhl
