= Barbarin, Navarre =

Human settlement in Spain

Coordinates: 42°36′N 2°06′W

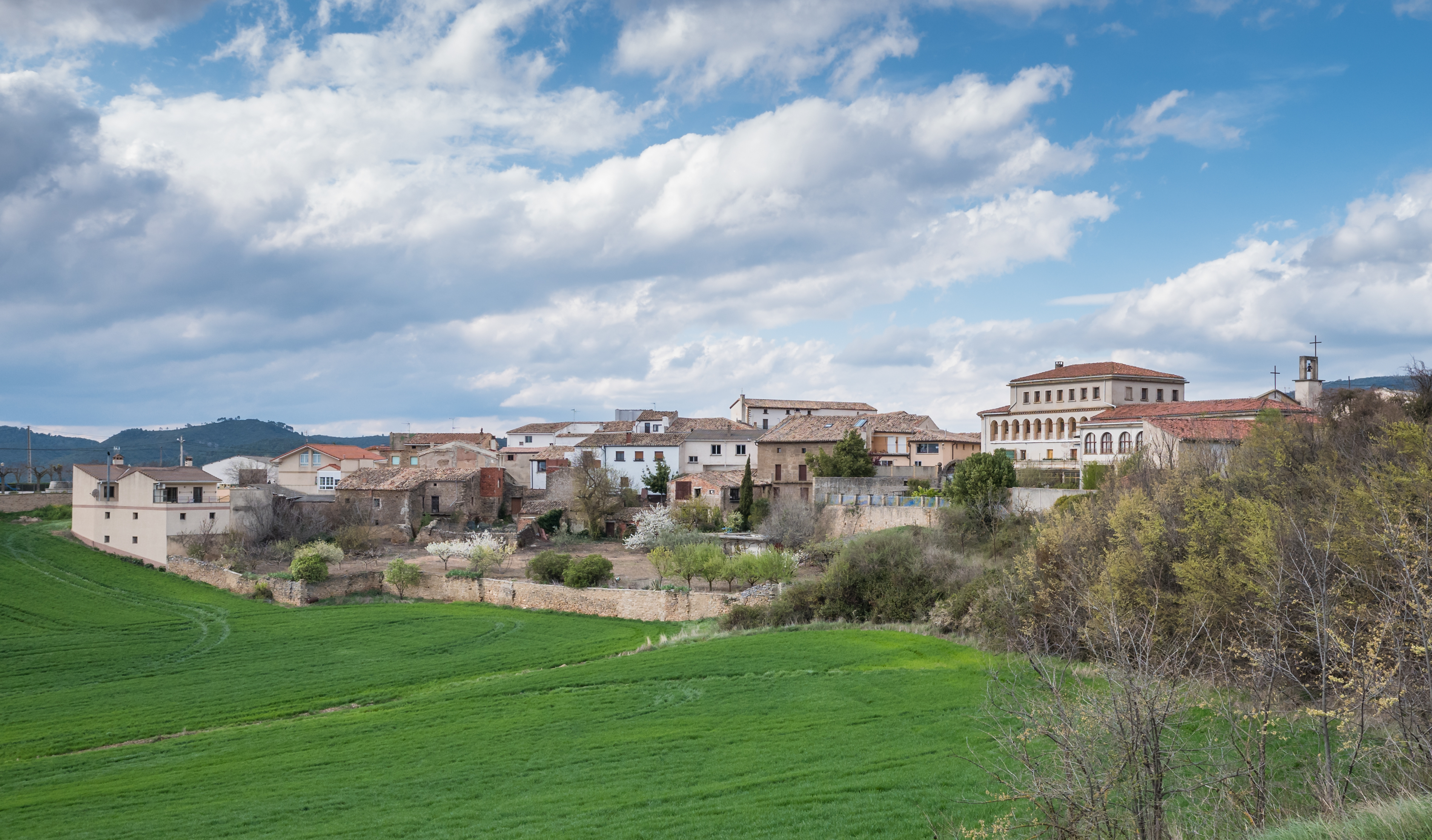
View of Barbarin. Navarre, Spain

Barbarin's coat of arms

Barbarin is a town and municipality located in the province and autonomous community of Navarre, northern Spain.
