= Romeldale =

American breed of sheep

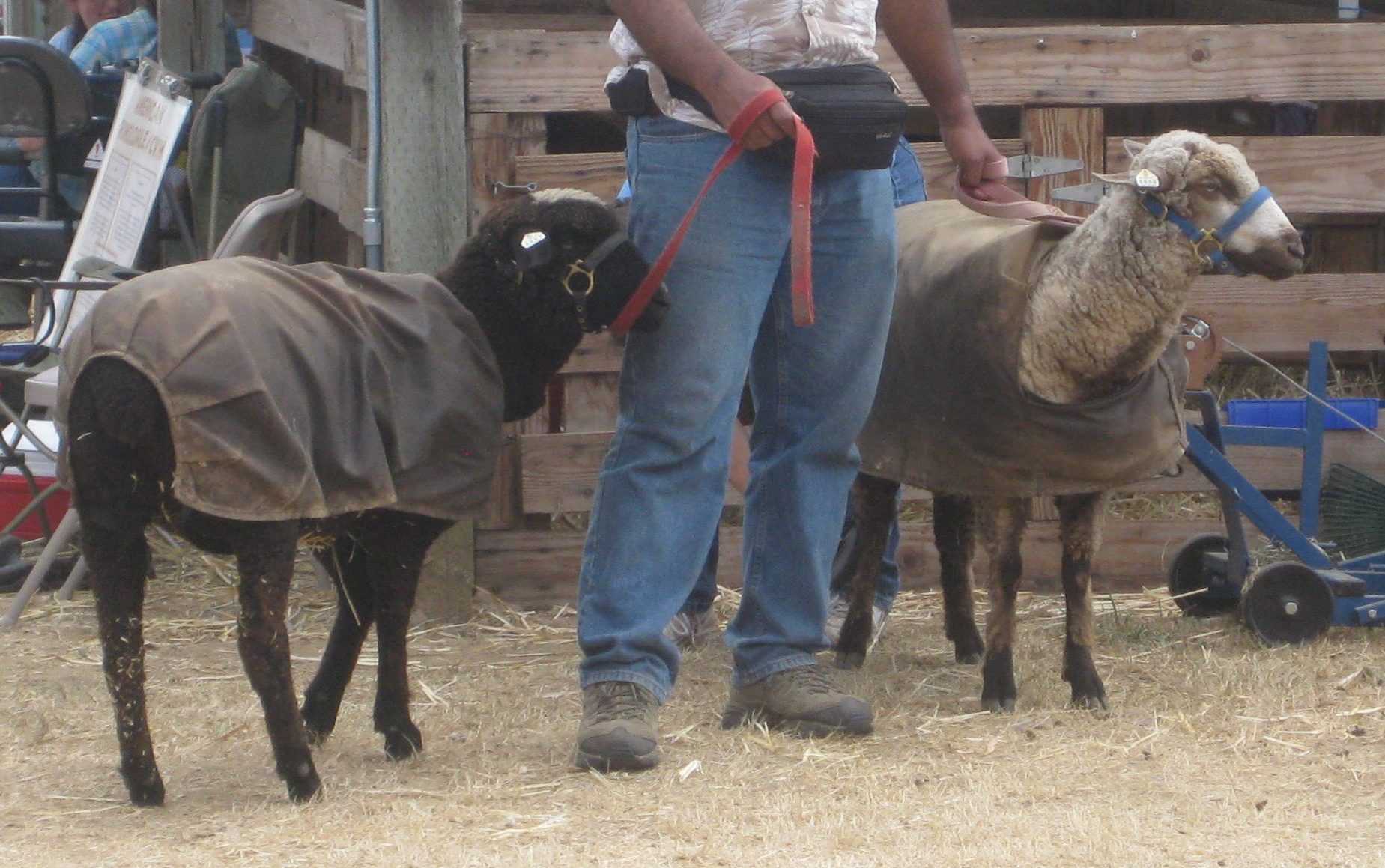
- Country of origin: United States

The Romeldale is an American breed of domestic sheep. It derives from cross-breeding of Romney rams and Rambouillet ewes from about 1915. The California Variegated Mutant is a rare badger-faced or variegated sub-type of the Romeldale. Some sources, as well as the breed association, refer to the two together as Romeldale/CVM.

== History ==
The Romeldale was developed in the early 1900s by A.T. Spencer, who crossed Romney rams which had been exhibited at the 1915 Panama-Pacific International Exposition with his flock of Rambouillet ewes. The breeding focused on producing soft, fine wool and good fleece weight, as well as medium to large market lambs for meat. Development of the Romeldale continued throughout the 1940s and 50s, but a breed association for the original Romeldale alone was never formed and it is largely confined to its home state of California.

=== California Variegated Mutant ===
Glen Eidman, during the 1960s, found a unique pattern in one of his Romeldale ewes. After subsequent breedings, the same pattern was found in one of his rams. After many attempts and selective breeding of the two sheep, a consistent badger-faced color pattern was found and the California Variegated Mutant was born. Mr. Eidman bred sheep for over 15 years without selling off any stock. In 1982, Mr. Eidman's flock of 75 sheep were dispersed to many different buyers throughout the United States. Different farms had different breeding goals. Thus, only a handful of farms kept the breed pure, without crossing them to other sheep breeds.

Today the Romeldale/CVM is still a very rare breed, and The Livestock Conservancy lists it as critical. The soft wool and the unusual colors of the CVM are especially prized by handspinners.

== Characteristics ==
Romeldales and CVMs are generally considered two types of the same breed. Other than color they share most of the same physical and temperamental traits, and are medium to large sheep at 150-275 pounds.

The original Romeldales are mostly white, though any sheep not conforming to the CVM standard may be registered as Romeldales. CVMs are all natural-colored sheep with a badger face pattern. Unusually for natural colored sheep, their fleece tends to darken with age rather than grow lighter. Both Romeldales and CVMs are polled.
