= Debouillet =

Breed of sheep

The Debouillet is a breed of domestic sheep originating from Tatum, New Mexico. It was developed in the 1920s through crossing Rambouillet and Delaine Merino sheep and the breed's name is a portmanteau of these two ancestors. This breed is primarily raised for its wool.

== Characteristics ==
Specifically adapted to the arid ranges of the Southwestern U.S., the breed is a medium–size sheep with long, fine wool. Ewes are polled and rams may or may not have horns.

Mature ewes will weigh from 125 lb (57 kg) to 160 lb (73 kg) and rams will weigh from 175 lb (79 kg) to 250 lb (113 kg).

The fleece from mature ewes will weigh 10 to 18 lb (4.5 to 8.1 kg) with a 35% to 50% yield. The staple length of the fleece is from 3 to 5 in (7.5 to 12.5 cm) with a numerical count of 62 to 80, which is 18.5 to 23.5 microns in diameter.
