= American Blackbelly =

American breed of sheep

- Conservation status: FAO (2007): not listed
- Country of origin: United States
- Distribution: Texas
- Standard: International Barbados Blackbelly Sheep Association
- Use: trophy hunting

Traits
- Weight: Male: 50–64 kg; Female: 34–43 kg
- Height: Male: 76–81 cm; Female: 60–70 cm
- Hair color: variable, from light fawn to dark mahogany; belly and inside of legs black
- Face color: black badger-face bars
- Horn status: rams horned, ewes usually polled (hornless)

The American Blackbelly is a modern American hybrid breed of sheep. It is a hair sheep, growing a hair coat rather than a wool fleece.

It was developed in Texas by crossing sheep of the Barbados Black Belly and Rambouillet breeds with Corsican mouflon. This produced a horned animal with a heavier carcase and increased muscle mass compared to the original black-bellied breed. It is closely similar to the Barbado, another Texas hybrid with similar origins.

== Characteristics ==
The American Blackbelly has the coloration of the Barbados breed – a brown hair coat ranging from light fawn to deep mahogany, with black underbelly and black insides of the ears and legs. Rams are horned, sometimes heavily so; ewes are usually polled, but may also be scurred or horned. It is a small sheep, with heights and weights closely similar to those of the Barbados BlackBelly: ewes weigh some 34–43 kg and stand 60–70 cm at the shoulder; rams weigh from 50 to 64 kg with a height of some 76–81 cm.

== Use ==
The sheep are usually reared for trophy hunting, but can also be raised for meat or kept for conservation grazing.
