= Lacaune sheep =

Breed of sheep

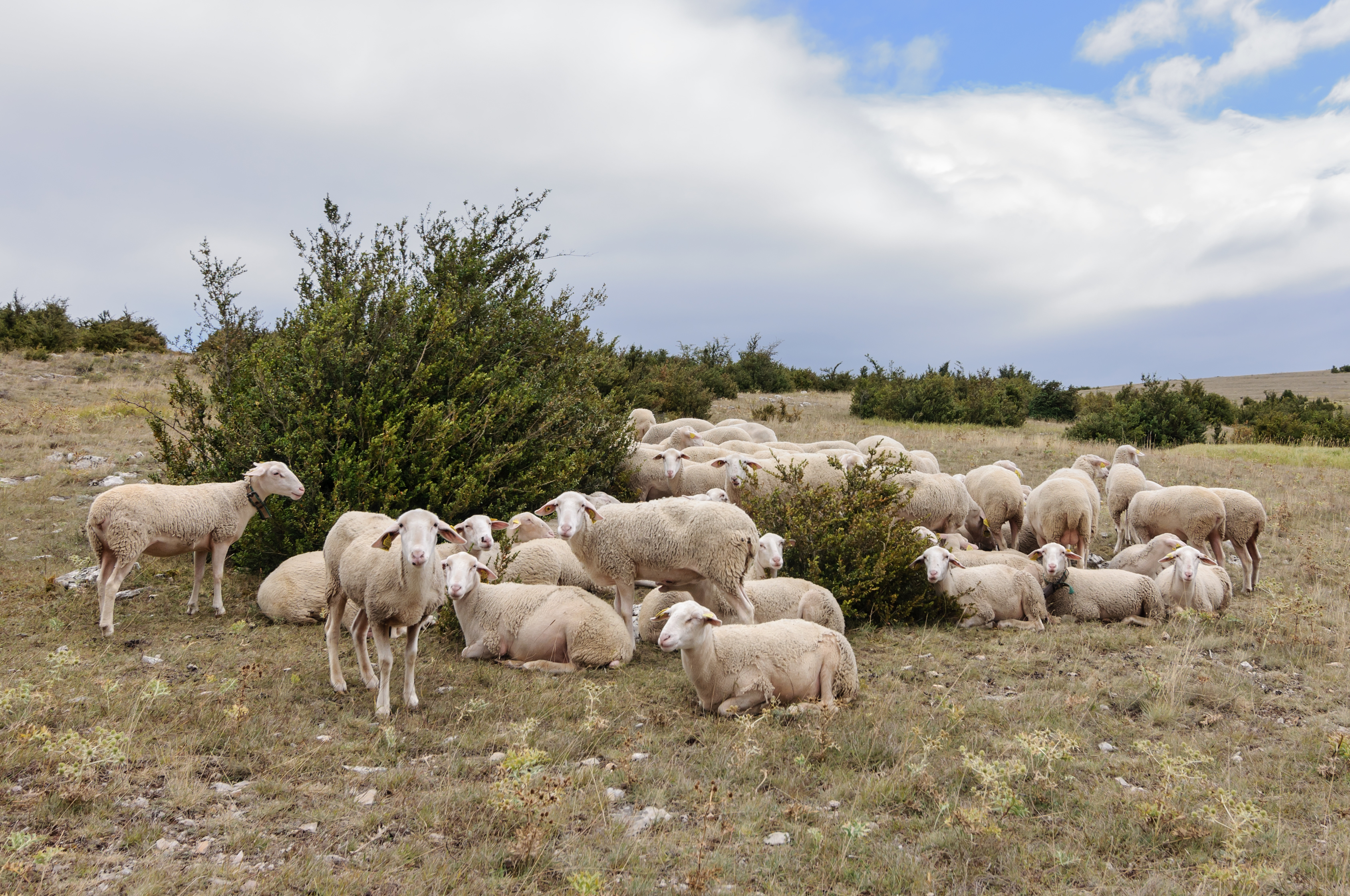
A flock of Lacaune sheep in Lozère, Massif Central, France

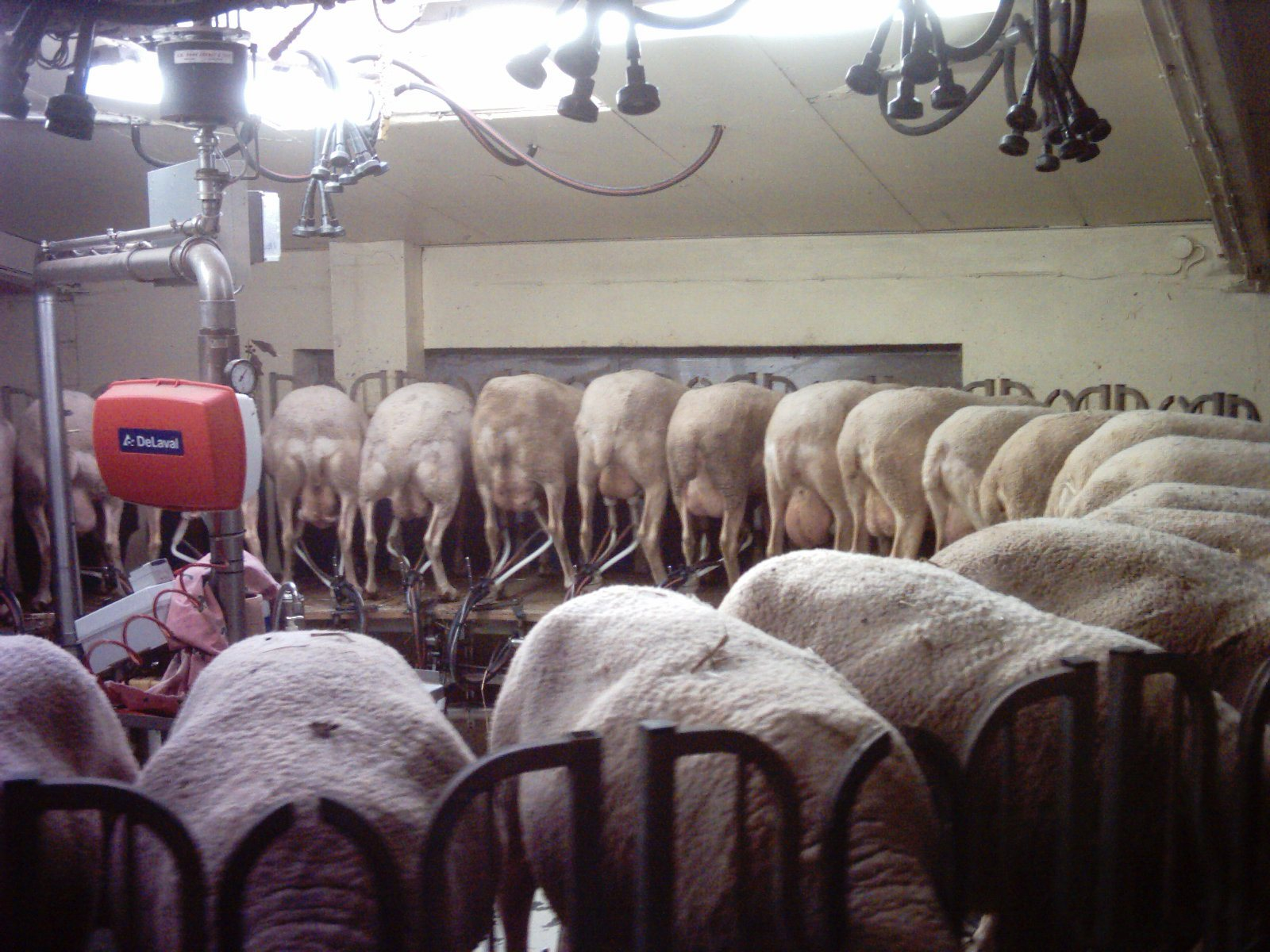
Lacaune sheep being milked by machine

The Lacaune (Languedocien: La Cauna) is a breed of domestic sheep originating near Lacaune in southern France. The native region of these sheep is the Tarn and Aveyron departments and surrounding areas. This region is collectively known as the "Roquefort Sector" which references the milk collection area. The Lacaune is the most widely used dairying sheep breed in France, with a population of about 800,000 ewes. Notably, it is the predominant breed used in the production of Roquefort cheese in France.

== History ==
Sheep first came to that region of France around 4,000 to 6,000 years ago. The land was rough and desolate but the sheep could adapt well to it. In the mid-19th century, farmers began to add genetics from other local breeds to produce a hardy breed of sheep that produced a rich milk and good meat. This was the development of the dual-purpose breed of original Lacaune. The Lacaune has been used as a milking sheep in France for a very long time, but milking wasn't the dominant feature of the breed until recently. In the late 1960s, the average milk yield per ewe was only about 70 liters during the human milking period (and excluding the lamb suckling period) per annum.

Remarkably, by the late 1990s the milk yield had quadrupled to 280 liters per annum. The Lacaune is now one of the world's high-yielding milk breeds. This was the result of a large-scale, rigorous selection program organized by a French government agency. This program included artificial insemination of several million ewes over the years, a vast array of government support for recording the performance of the progeny on many farms with respect to the milk yield and other outcomes, improved knowledge about animal management and nutrition for sheep milk production, and the willingness of many farmers to participate in the program and take advantage of what was being learned. The combination of these and other factors brought about an improvement of 6.3% per year in milk yield per ewe in the breed over the 30-year period. The 6.3% gain is decomposable to "a phenotypic gain of 3.9% (better management and nutrition) and a genetic gain of 2.4%. Since 1995 the phenotypic gain has been negligible."

The success of the large-scale breeding program has not resulted in the extinction of the pre-existing, lower-milk-yielding Lacaunes.

== Breed characteristics ==
When compared to other sheep primarily used for their milk, the Lacaune are a much hardier breed of dairy sheep. The breed is less prone to diseases but crossbreeding for hybrid vigor is still recommended to reduce the amount of incidences of disease in lambs. They also do not have as high of birth rates as other dairy sheep. They produce less milk than other breeds such as East Friesian but their milk has a higher fat and protein content which produces a higher yield when making cheese.

The breed is polled (hornless) and are able to resist very large swings in temperature. They weigh between 70 and 100 kilograms (150 and 220 lb). The breed is well fit for harsh terrain with small hooves that can navigate the rocky hillside.

Wool production in this breed is not very prominent either. Many Lacaune sheep have very little wool and their head, legs, and sometimes the whole belly is bare. Their double coat of wool is able to shed one layer in the summer so they can keep cool.

The Lacaune sheep are usually white in colour. Their heads are elongated and the snout is slightly rounded. Their ears slope downwards and are a bit floppy compared to other breeds. These sheep also have a quite bold temperament and are less docile than other dairy breeds of sheep.

When being milked, Lacaune sheep have an oxytocin release that is higher than other breeds with teat stimulation. This means that the milk will be let down easier in Lacaune sheep than in other dairy breeds of sheep. This breed also has a shorter average time to reach the peak rate of flow due to this. The time to reach peak flow also decreases later in lactation. Lacaune have a smaller area in their gland cistern of their udder than other dairy sheep breeds like East Friesian. This means that the stripping yield of the Lacaune sheep is not as high as in other breeds. They also have the highest udder depth of all the milking sheep breeds which correlates to their higher productivity.

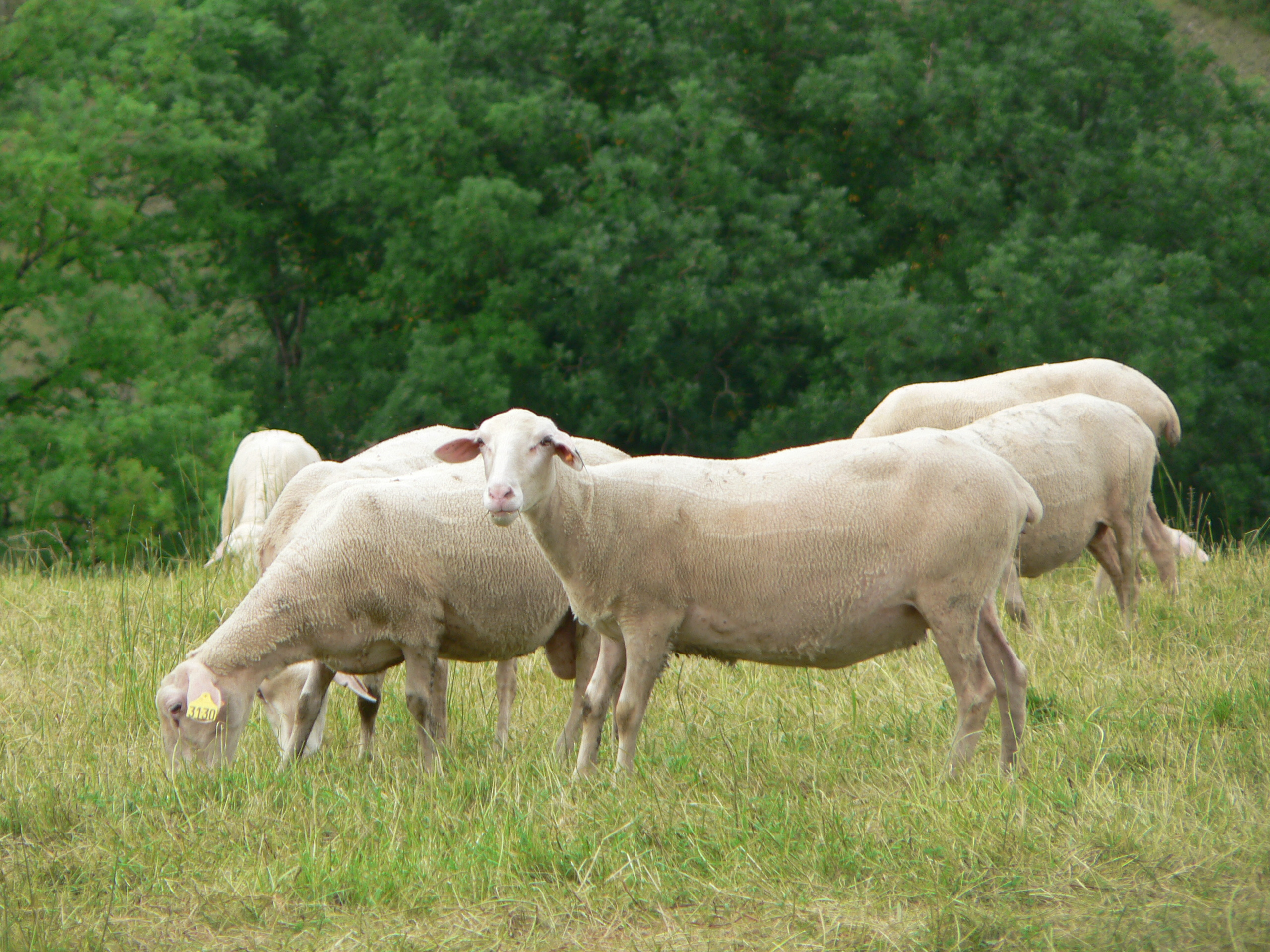
Lacaune sheep out to pasture.

== Production system ==
Due to the surrounding landscape, Lacaune dairy sheep are most adapted to pasture management. Due to the intensification of the dairy production systems, Lacaune sheep spend part of the year in the sheepfold. The first few weeks of milking take place in the sheepfold but sheep are let out into the pasture during the day. Lacaune sheep are the second highest producing dairy sheep breed in the world.

One study showed that Lacaune have a higher production in the beginning of lactation than at the end compared to other breeds. It also showed that this breed has a higher average flow rate and higher peak flow rate.

Lambing takes place once a year, near the end of the year (November to January). Lambs are allowed to suckle for 5 weeks and then are weaned off so the ewes' milk can be used for production of Roquefort cheese. Lambs produced that are not being used as replacements for the dairy herd are sent to the market. Due to the lambing time, Lacaune lambs are usually the first to arrive on the market each year.

As in most dairy breeds and animals, mastitis is one of the major causes of culling in herds and flocks. Not as much research has been done on the genetic aspects of intramammary infections in sheep. More genetic testing for mastitis resistance needs to be carried out to improve genetics in the Lacaune sheep breed and their milk quality.

== Selection program ==
The breed began as a dual purpose breed with a low milk production. In the 1980s, the Lacaune genetic improvement program was established. This program wanted to improve the breed as a whole and have the Lacaune sheep be able to compete against foreign breeds that were not as adapted to the environment. Focus was put mainly on increasing the milk production of the breed. This program utilized artificial insemination, milk recording, and progeny testing sires. It started with genomic selection in a few nucleus flocks of sheep. Intensive management and testing were done with these sheep that produced, after a few generations, breeding rams that were able to transfer their genetics to the rest of the populations through mainly artificial insemination. This pyramidal management breeding system is how the improvement of the breed was implemented. There was a slight delay between the original nucleus population and the rest of the commercial population of around 5–7 years. Today, the program has expanded its focus to improving other important aspects such as udder quality, lower somatic cell counts, and milk components. Since the program began, there has been an improvement of over 5 L per lactation, 0.19 g/L of fat content, and 0.17 g/L of crude protein content. The Lacaune breed, due to this extensive program, has the most studied genetics than any dairy sheep breed in the world.

One of the reasons that this programs became so successful was the intense decrease in the cost of genotyping and sequencing the genome in animals. This information is very useful in selecting for physical traits as well as other traits such as scrapie resistance.

== Milk and cheese ==
The milk of the Lacaune is described usually as wholesome with a high butterfat and protein content and rich flavour. The butterfat content of the milk makes it good for producing many different types of cheese.

The main use of the Lacaune sheep is for production of Roquefort cheese. Theirs is the only milk used to produce the cheese. Roquefort is a blue cheese that is usually made from the unpasteurized milk of Lacaune sheep. The semi-soft cheese usually has a creamy and crumbly texture.

== See also ==
- East Friesian (sheep), another dairy breed of sheep
