= Brazilian Somali =

Brazilian breed of sheep

- Conservation status: FAO (2007): not at risk; DAD-IS (2026): at risk/endangered
- Other names: Somali Brasileiro; Somális Brasileira; Rabo Gordo
- Country of origin: Brazil

Traits
- Weight: Male: 70 kg; Female: 42 kg
- Height: Male: 60 cm; Female: 55 cm
- Face colour: black

The Brazilian Somali or Somális Brasileira is a Brazilian breed of domestic sheep. It derives from cross-breeding of local sheep with Blackheaded Persian stock imported to Brazil in 1939 from the West Indies. It is among the ten Brazilian sheep breeds classified as "naturalised" or "local" in the country; a further thirteen are classed as "exotic". It is a fat-rumped breed, and so may also be known as the Rabo Gordo, 'fat rump'.

== History ==
The Brazilian Somali derives from cross-breeding of local sheep with Blackheaded Persian stock imported to Brazil in 1939 from the West Indies. It is among the ten Brazilian sheep breeds classified as "naturalised" or "local" in the country; a further thirteen are classed as "exotic".

In 1972 the total number of the sheep in Brazil was estimated at 120000–160000 head; in 2007 the conservation status of the breed was listed by the Food and Agriculture Organization of the United Nations as "not at risk". In 2020 a total of 2546 head was reported; and in 2026 the conservation status was listed as "at risk/endangered".

== Characteristics ==
The Brazilian Somali, like the Blackheaded Persian from which it derives, is white with a black head. It is a hair sheep, growing hair rather than wool; it is polled (hornless) and belongs to the fat-rumped group of breeds. Average body weights are about 42 kg for ewes and 70 kg for rams; average heights at the withers are approximately 55 cm and 60 cm respectively.
