= Fries Melkschaap =

Sheep breed from East Frisia in northern Germany

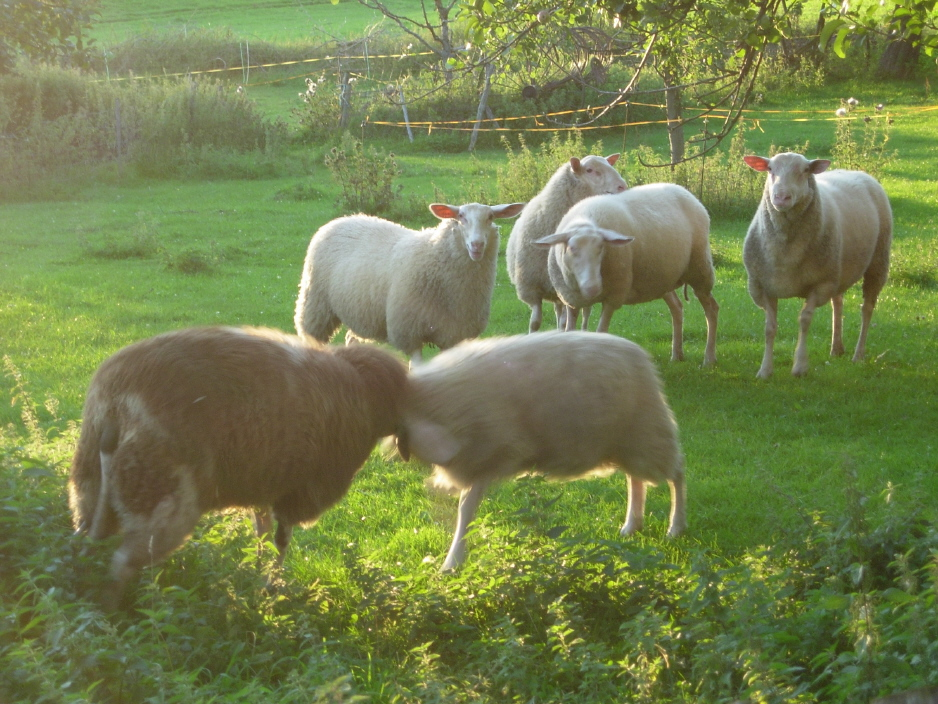
- Conservation status: FAO (2007): not at risk; DAD-IS (2023): at risk/endangered-maintained
- Other names: East Friesian; Ostfriesisches Milchschaf
- Country of origin: Germany; The Netherlands
- Distribution: about 24 countries

Traits
- Weight: Male: 112 kg; Female: 70 kg
- Height: Male: 75 cm; Female: 60 cm

The Fries Melkschaap is a Dutch and German breed of dairy sheep. It originates in the Frisia region, which includes parts of both the north-eastern Netherlands and north-western Germany. It has many names: the German stock is known as the Ostfriesisches Milchschaf, or in English as the East Friesian, the East Friesland Milch or the German Milksheep, while the Dutch equivalent is known as the Friesian Milk or Friesian Milksheep, or less often as the Friesian or West Friesian. Under suitable management conditions, it is among the highest-yielding of dairy sheep breeds.

== History ==
The breed originates in the Frisia region of north-western Germany and northern Holland.

== Characteristics ==
The Friesian sheep breeds are a heathland type sheep, the land environment in much of Frisia. The group includes related dairy breeds taking their names from, and probably largely originating in, West Friesland and Zeeland. Historically, the sheep were kept in small numbers by households for household milk. They do poorly in large, dense flocks.

In physical appearance, East Friesians have pink noses and their heads and legs are clear of wool. Their heads are naturally polled. They generally have pale hooves. The most distinctive feature of an East Friesian is its tail, which is described as a "rat-tail" because it is thin and free of wool. Elsewhere on their bodies they have white wool which is about 35-37 microns, with a staple length of 120–160 mm and their fleece ranges from 4–5 kg (8.8–11.0 lb). There also exists a dark brown variation of East Friesian.

== Use ==
The East Friesian produces roughly 300-600 litres of milk, over a 200- to 300-day lactation. There are reports of individual animals with milk yield reaching 900 litres, counting the milk suckled by the lambs, as well as milking by machine. To provide a high milk yield, the ewe must receive a high-quality diet.

Another attraction of the breed is a relatively high average number of lambs born per ewe.

East Friesians are used as either a purebred milking breed or as a crossing breed for other milking sheep. They can raise the average number of lambs born, as well as milk production, when crossed with other milk sheep breeds. They are not a very hardy or adaptable breed, but their cross-breeds can be. Crossing them with the Awassi breed has been a notable success in Mediterranean or semiarid environments. East Friesians crossed with the Lacaune breed have been a success in the Wisconsin environment. East Friesians were not introduced into North America until the 1990s, but since then, on account of their high milk yield, they have rapidly become the breed of choice among commercial sheep milk producers, although generally not in purebred form.
