= Morada Nova sheep =

Breed of sheep

Morada Nova
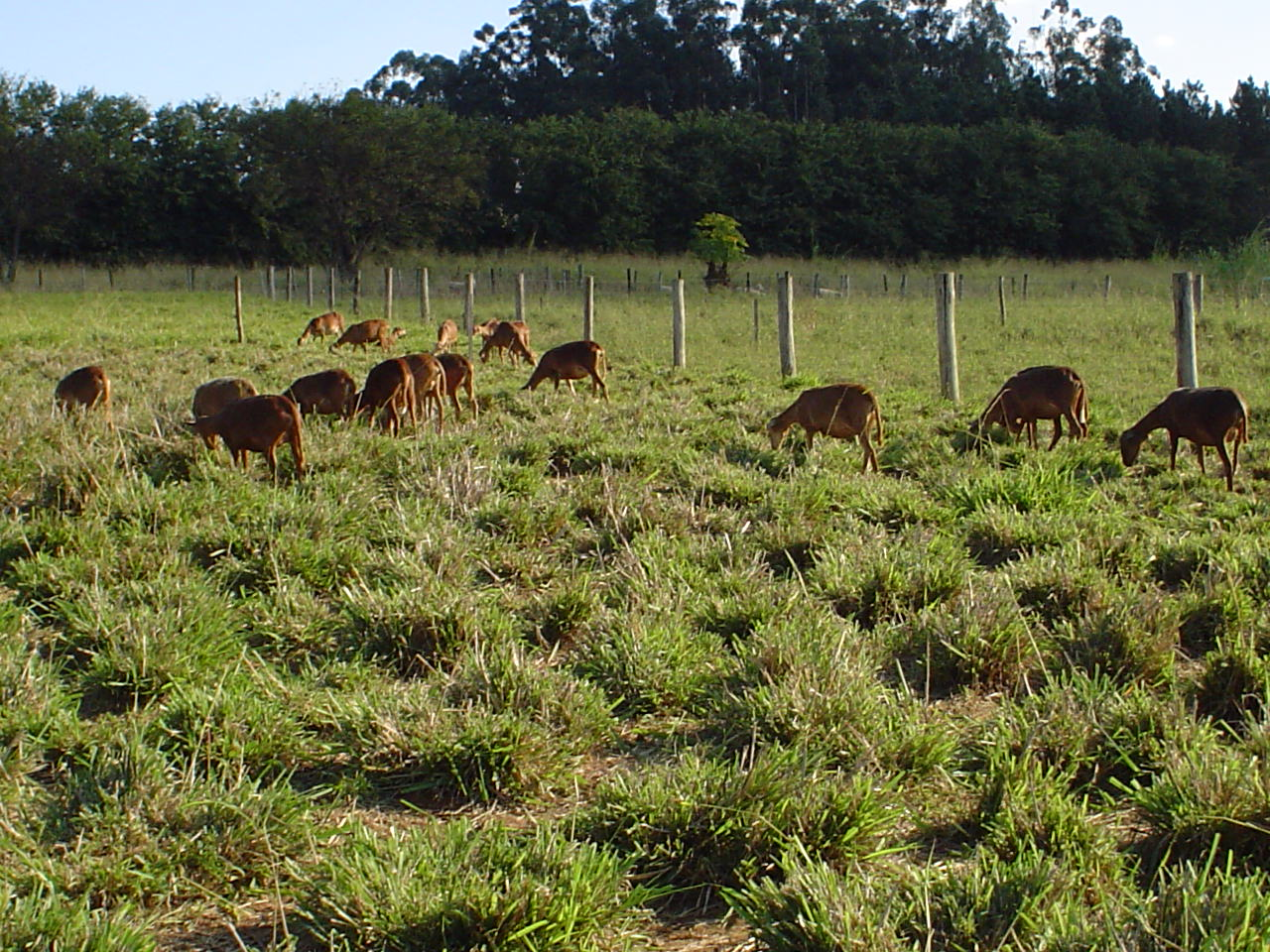
- Other names: Deslanado do Nordeste; Deslanado vermelho; Deslanado branco; Brazilian Woolless
- Country of origin: Brazil
- Distribution: Nordeste
- Use: dual-purpose, meat and hide

Traits
- Weight: Male: 40 kg; Female: 30 kg
- Height: Male: 65 cm; Female: 61 cm
- Wool color: solid colour, red or white
- Horn status: Ewes hornless, rams may have scurs

Morada Nova is a Brazilian breed of domestic sheep. It originates in the state of Ceará, in Nordeste, the north-eastern region of Brazil, on the Atlantic coast.

== Characteristics ==
Derives from the Brazilian Woolless breed, resulting in its unique characteristics. Both male and female are polled, meaning they lack horns. Making it difficult to distinguish its gender. Males Weigh up to 88lbs while the female can go up to 66lbs.

== Background ==
The Morada Nova is well adapted to the varied climatic conditions of the sertão, and well able to forage in the caatinga scrub biome of the area. It is reared principally for meat. Animals are slaughtered when they are between 18 and 24 months old, when they weigh 27–35 kg. Males are not usually castrated. The hides are of good quality. Ewes are not milked, and the sheep are not shorn. Additionally, despite either positive or negative health status, the body of the female Morada Novas adapts incredibly from the moment they give birth until weaning. In order to increase herd production and effective deliveries, its best female Morada Novas mate within the first 18 days of breeding onset. Lastly, Morada Nova sheep are one of the only breeds that are resilient to the parasitism of, "Haemonchus Contortus" infection. A parasite that targets and kills sheep and goats around the world.
