= American Tunis =

Breed of sheep

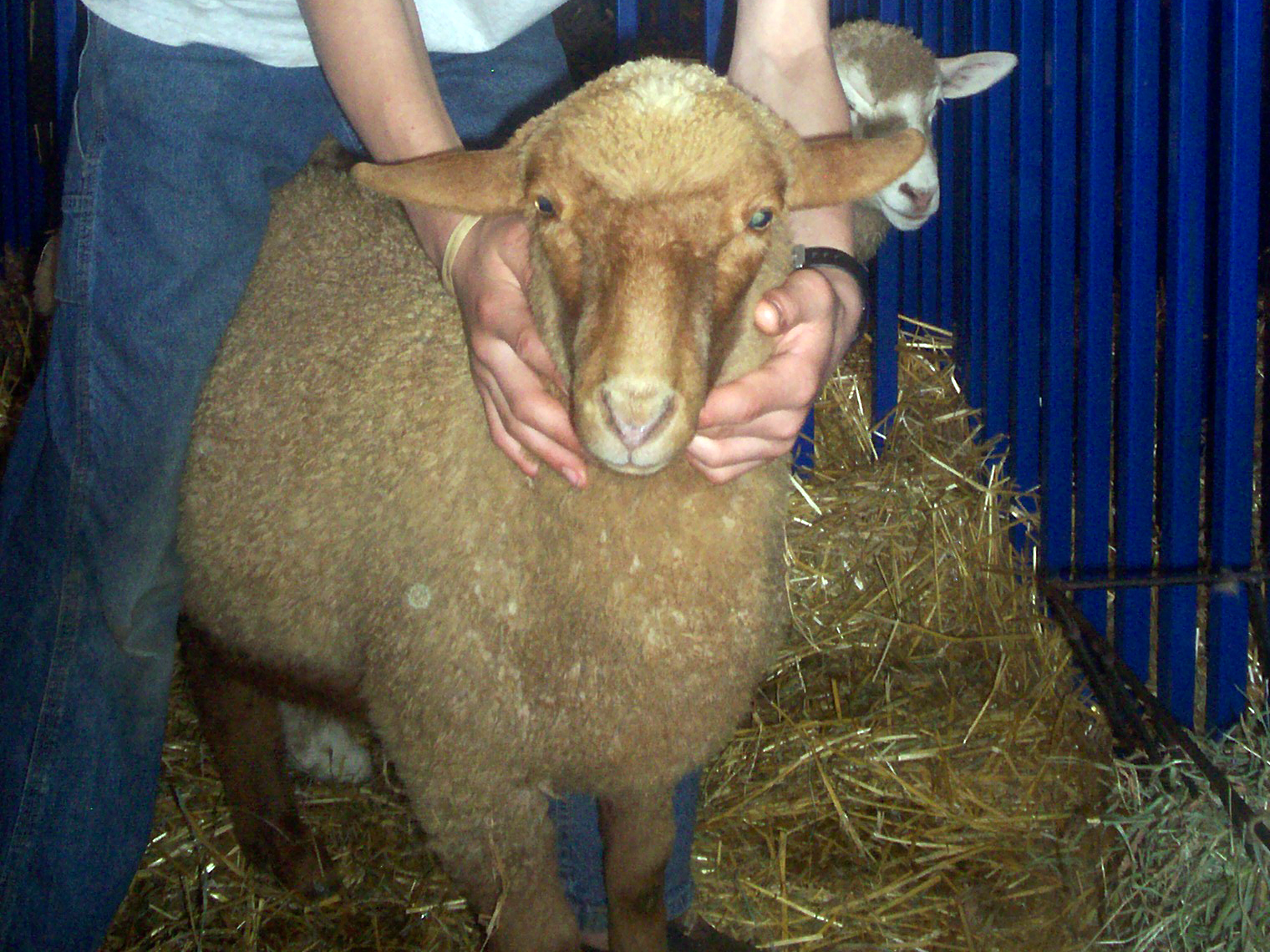
- At the Maryland Sheep and Wool Festival in 2008
- Conservation status: FAO (2007): endangered; Livestock Conservancy: watch
- Other names: Tunis
- Country of origin: United States
- Standard: National Tunis Sheep Registry
- Type: Fat-tailed
- Use: Meat, wool

Traits
- Weight: Male: 91 kg; Female: 66 kg
- Wool color: White
- Face color: Red
- Horn status: Both sexes polled (hornless)

The American Tunis or Tunis is an endangered American breed of fat-tailed sheep. It derives from Tunisian Barbarin sheep imported to the United States from Tunisia in 1799. It is raised primarily for meat.

== History ==
In 1799, the Bey of Tunis, Hammuda ibn Ali, sent ten Tunisian Barbarin sheep as a gift to George Washington. Two reached the Belmont estate of Richard Peters in Pennsylvania. Peters lent his Tunis rams for breeding and the breed gradually spread. It was much written about, and is documented in the writings of several noted figures of the time, among them John Adams, George Washington Custis and Thomas Jefferson, and later Charles Roundtree, who in the early twentieth century was secretary of the American Tunis Sheep Breeders Association. The Tunis became the principal meat breed of the Mid-Atlantic and Upper South regions, but virtually disappeared during the American Civil War. After the Civil War, the Tunis was raised mostly in New England and in the Great Lakes region. In the late nineteenth century some were moved to Indiana, where there was some cross-breeding with Southdown stock. A breeders' association, the American Tunis Sheep Breeders Association, was constituted in 1896.

The Tunis is listed as "watch" on the watchlist of the Livestock Conservancy. Tunis sheep have been added to the Slow Food Ark of Taste.
