= Panama sheep =

Breed of sheep

The Panama is a breed of domestic sheep native to the United States. Though its name is identical to the country of Panama, the breed was in fact named for the Panama–Pacific International Exposition where it was shown early on in its history.

Panama sheep originated in 1912 in Muldoon, Idaho. Today Panama sheep are rare - largely unknown outside Idaho and Montana, and are one of only a few breeds which were started by private individuals in the United States. They were developed by James Laidlaw, a Scottish immigrant to the region who was seeking a large sheep better suited to the range than the Merinos which were most common in the late 19th and early 20th centuries. The foundation of the breed was a cross of Rambouillet rams to Lincoln ewes.

Panamas are polled sheep with white fleece of medium length and a large body suitable for meat production. Panama rams average 250–280 pounds and Panama ewes average 180–210 pounds when fully grown. They are particularly known for hardiness in the rough conditions of the northern Rocky Mountains. A breed registry was formed in 1951, but it has been inactive and it's unclear whether the majority of Panamas present today have not been crossbred. The sole remaining flock that is known to be pure is one maintained by the University of Idaho.
