= Merinolandschaf =

German breed of sheep

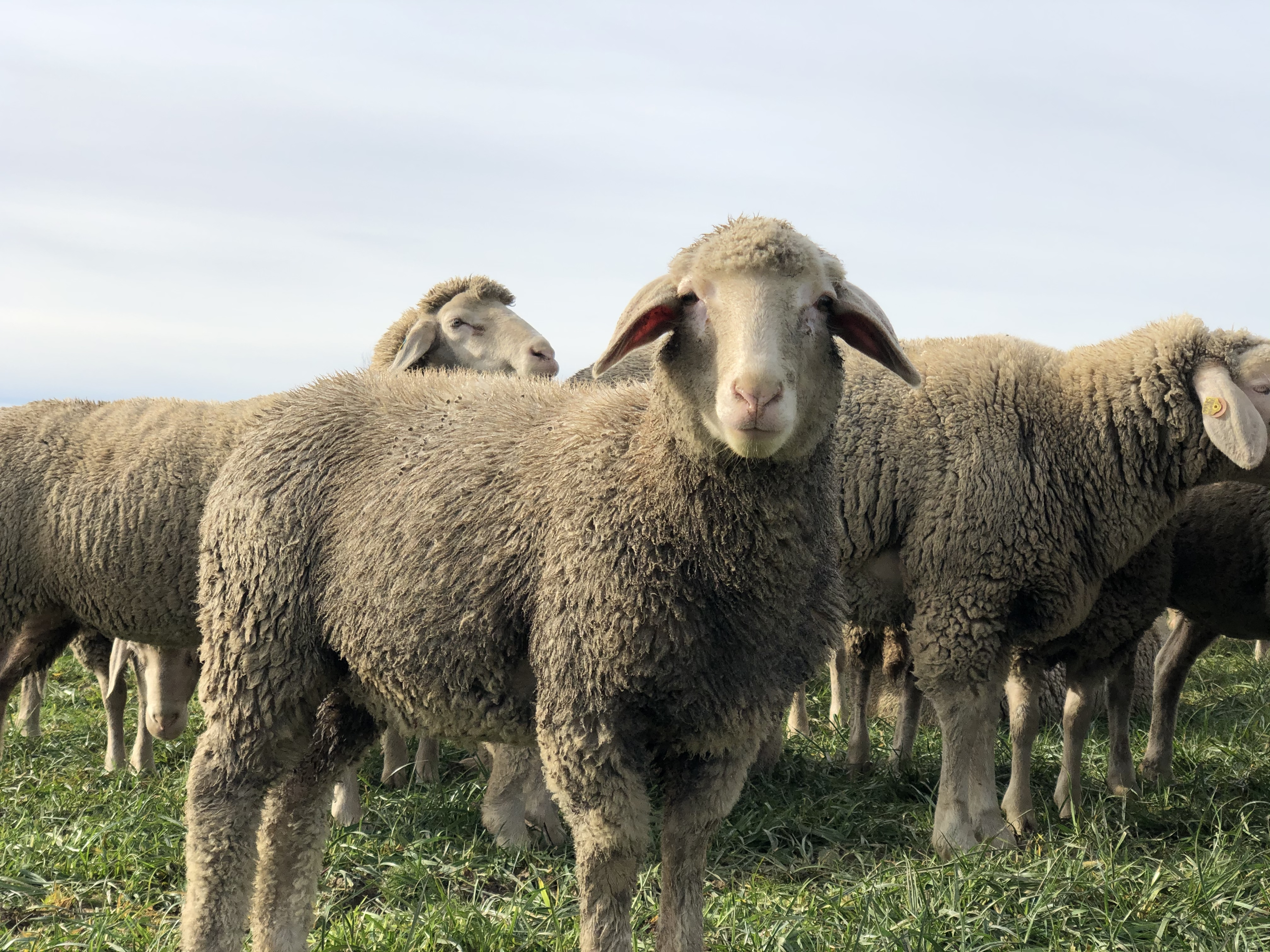
- Ewe lamb at about six months

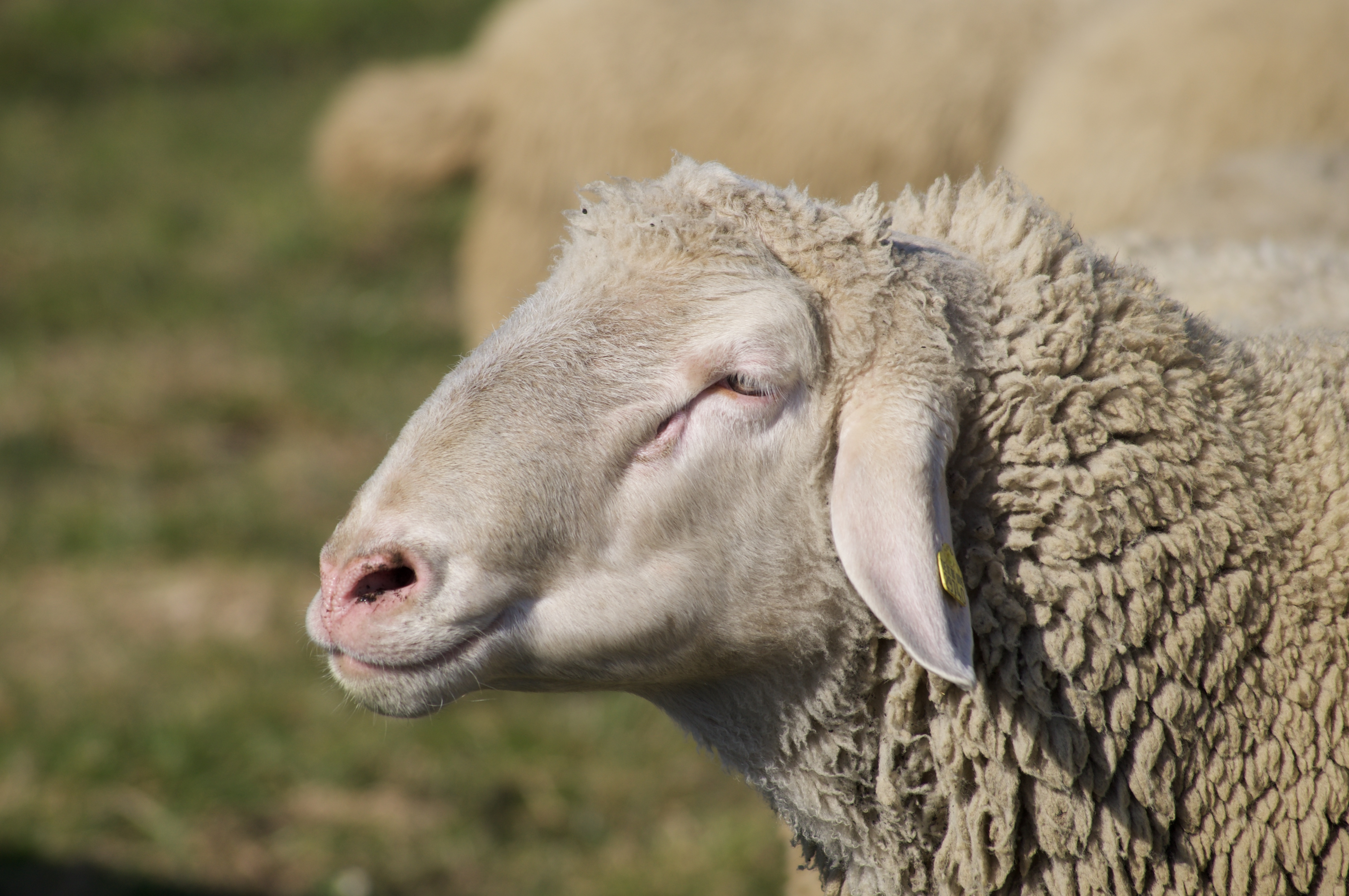
- A ram
- Other names: Württemberger
- Country of origin: Germany
- Use: dual-purpose, meat and wool

Traits
- Weight: Male: 125–160 kg; Female: 75–90 kg
- Wool colour: white
- Face colour: white

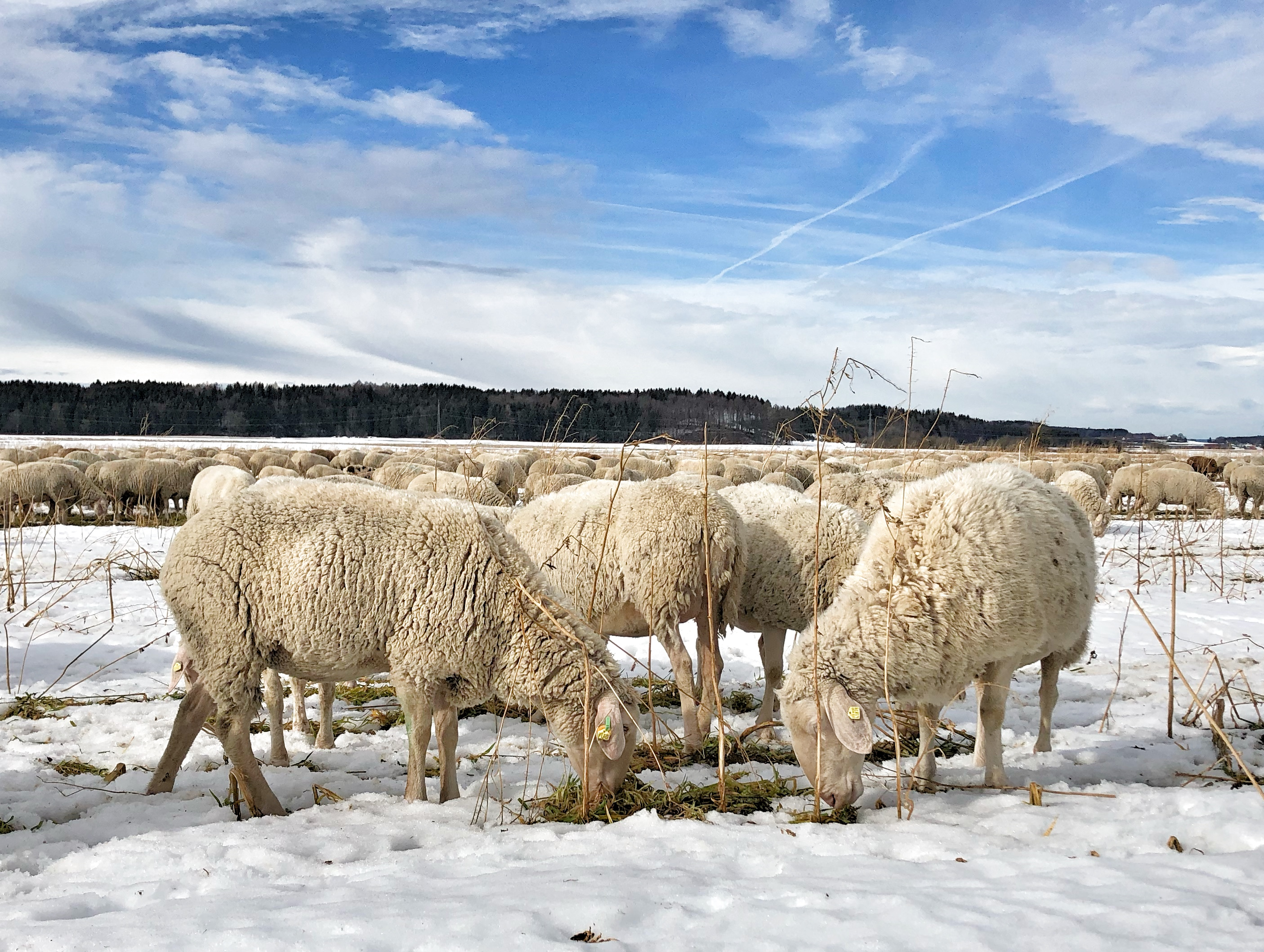
Flock near Bad Waldsee, in Baden-Württemberg

The Merinolandschaf or Württemberger is a German breed of domestic sheep derived from the Merino. It constitutes about 30% of the sheep population of Germany and is the most common commercial breed of the country. It descends from the Merino sheep first brought to Saxony in 1765.

In 2018 a population of 15378 head was reported to DAD-IS.
