= Barbados Black Belly =

Barbadian breed of sheep

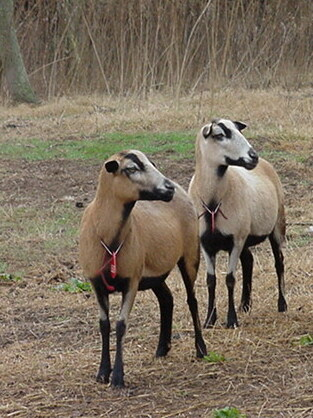
- At the small ruminant project at Virginia State University in 2001
- Other names: Barbados Black Belly; Black Belly; Barbados Barriga Nigra
- Country of origin: Barbados
- Distribution: 25 countries world-wide, mainly Caribbean and South America
- Use: meat

Traits
- Hair colour: black, brown
- Face colour: black, brown
- Horn status: polled

Notes
- good resistance to heat and parasites

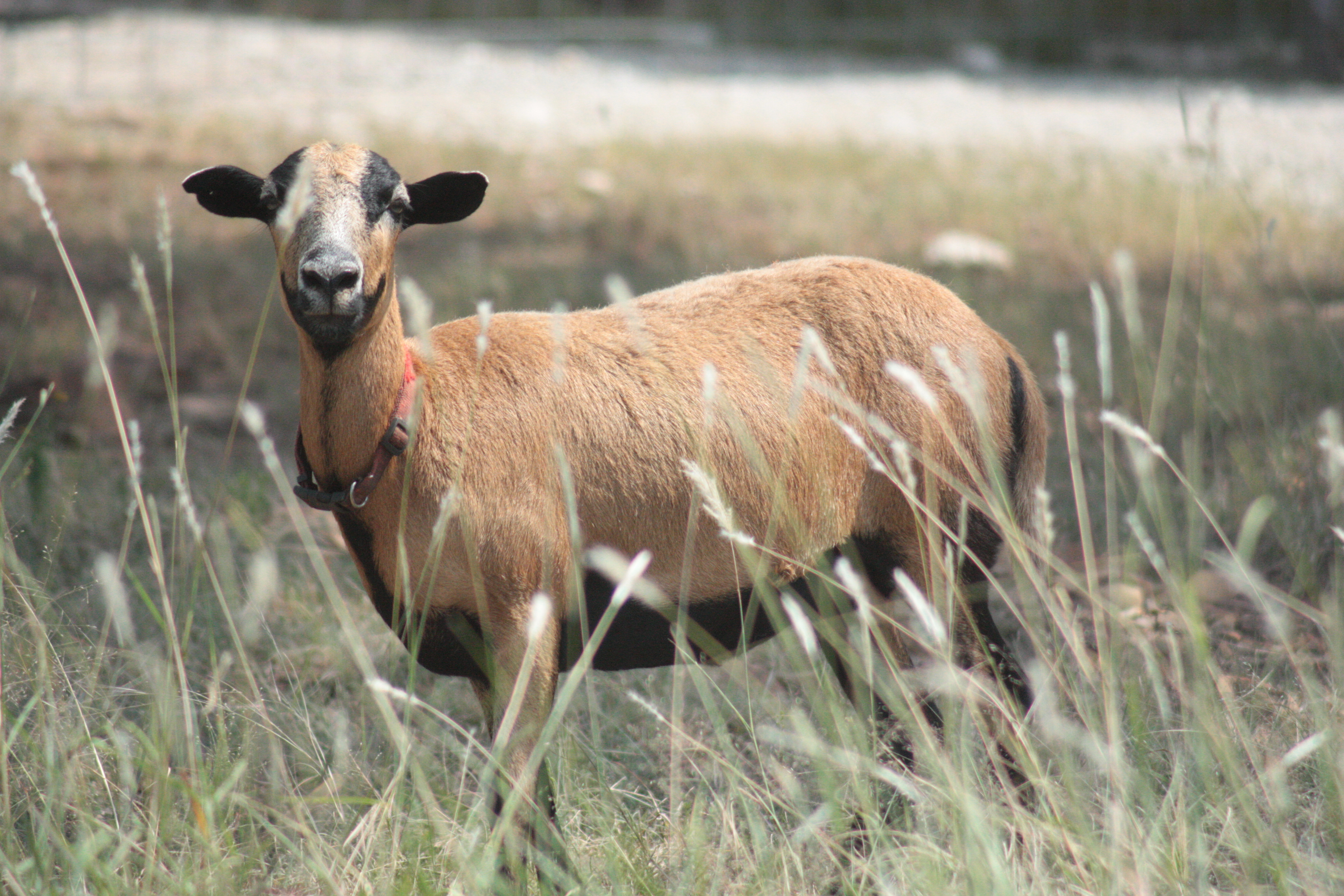
A ewe

The Barbados Black Belly is a breed of domestic sheep from the Caribbean island of Barbados. It is raised primarily for meat. Unlike most tropical sheep, it is highly prolific, with an average litter size of approximately 2.

It is widely distributed, with populations in twenty-five countries in the Americas, Asia and Europe. It is most abundant in the Caribbean region, in Mexico and in Peru. In 2015 the total world population was estimated at 158000.

== History ==
In 1624, when William Courten arrived in Barbados, the only domestic animal on the island was the pig. By about 1650 sheep of two different types had been introduced, as described by Richard Ligon in his True and Exact History of the Island of Barbadoes of 1657: there were European wool sheep, which did not do well on the coarse pasture of the island, and hair sheep brought from West Africa. By the mid-eighteenth century the wool sheep were no longer seen on the island; Griffith Hughes describes only hair sheep in The Natural History of Barbados, published in 1750.

In 1980 the purebred Black Belly constituted approximately one third of the total number of sheep in Barbados, which at that time was about 30000; much of the rest of the population consisted of hair sheep of much the same type. The Black Belly has been exported to many countries and is widely distributed, with populations in twenty-five countries in the Americas, Asia and Europe. It is most abundant in the Caribbean region, in Mexico and in Peru. In 2015 the total world population was estimated at 158000.

In the United States it has been cross-bred with Corsican Mouflon to produce the American Blackbelly, a distinctively-marked reddish sheep of small to medium size, which in males develops very large horns; the ewes are polled. There are 250–500 thousand of these in Texas, where many are reared as trophy animals to be shot by hunters. The Barbado is a similar cross-breed with similar breeding. In 2014 the United States reported 212 head of the original Barbados Black Belly breed.

A cross-breed with the St. Croix was developed in the United States in the late twentieth century; some stock was exported to the Indonesian island of Sumatra in 1994.

== Characteristics ==
The Black Belly is well adapted to tropical conditions: it has a high tolerance of parasites and is able to survive by grazing tropical grasses of poor quality, even in severe tropical heat and humidity. It is a hair sheep, growing hair rather than wool. Unlike most tropical sheep, it is highly prolific, with an average litter size of approximately 2.

== Use ==
The Black Belly is reared primarily for meat.
