= Tunisian Barbarin =

Breed of sheep

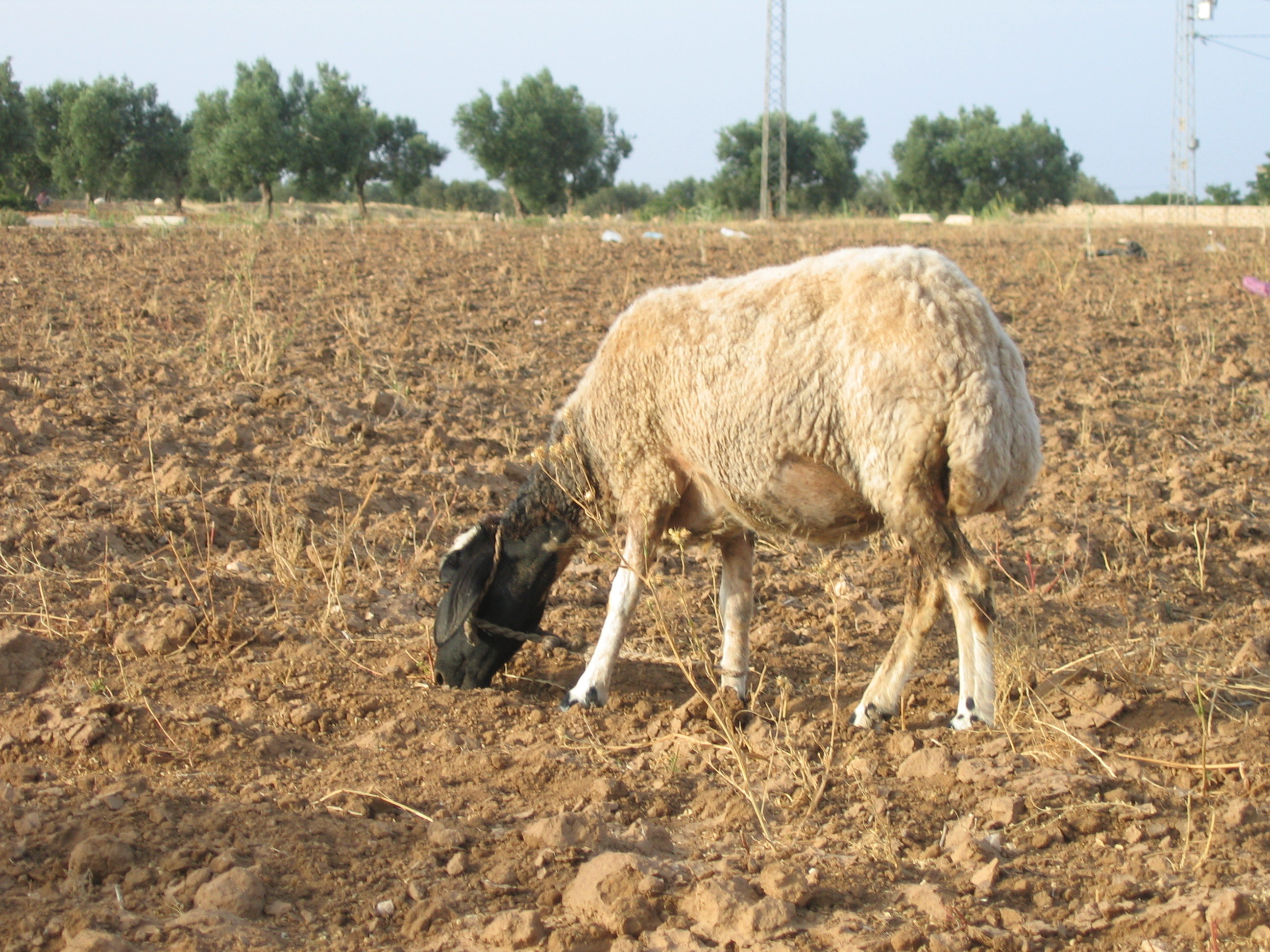
- Conservation status: FAO (2007): not at risk
- Other names: Tunisian Barbary; Constantinois; Moutons de l'Oued Souf; Tunisien; Barbary
- Country of origin: Tunisia
- Use: meat

Traits
- Weight: Male: 75 kg; Female: 45 kg
- Height: Male: 70 cm; Female: 60 cm
- Wool colour: white
- Face colour: red or black
- Horn status: Males horned or hornless, ewes always hornless

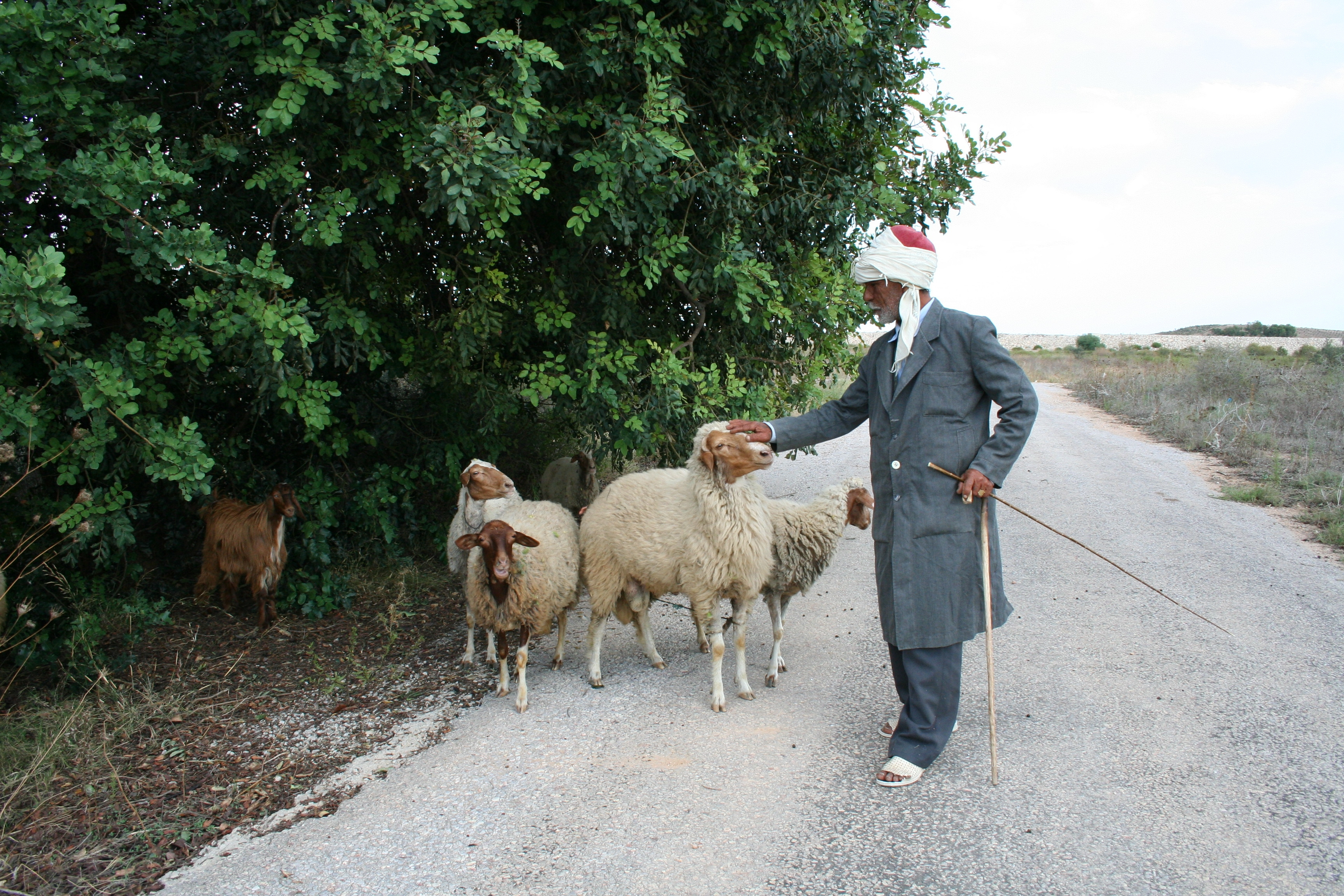
Shepherd with Barbarin sheep near Bou Achar

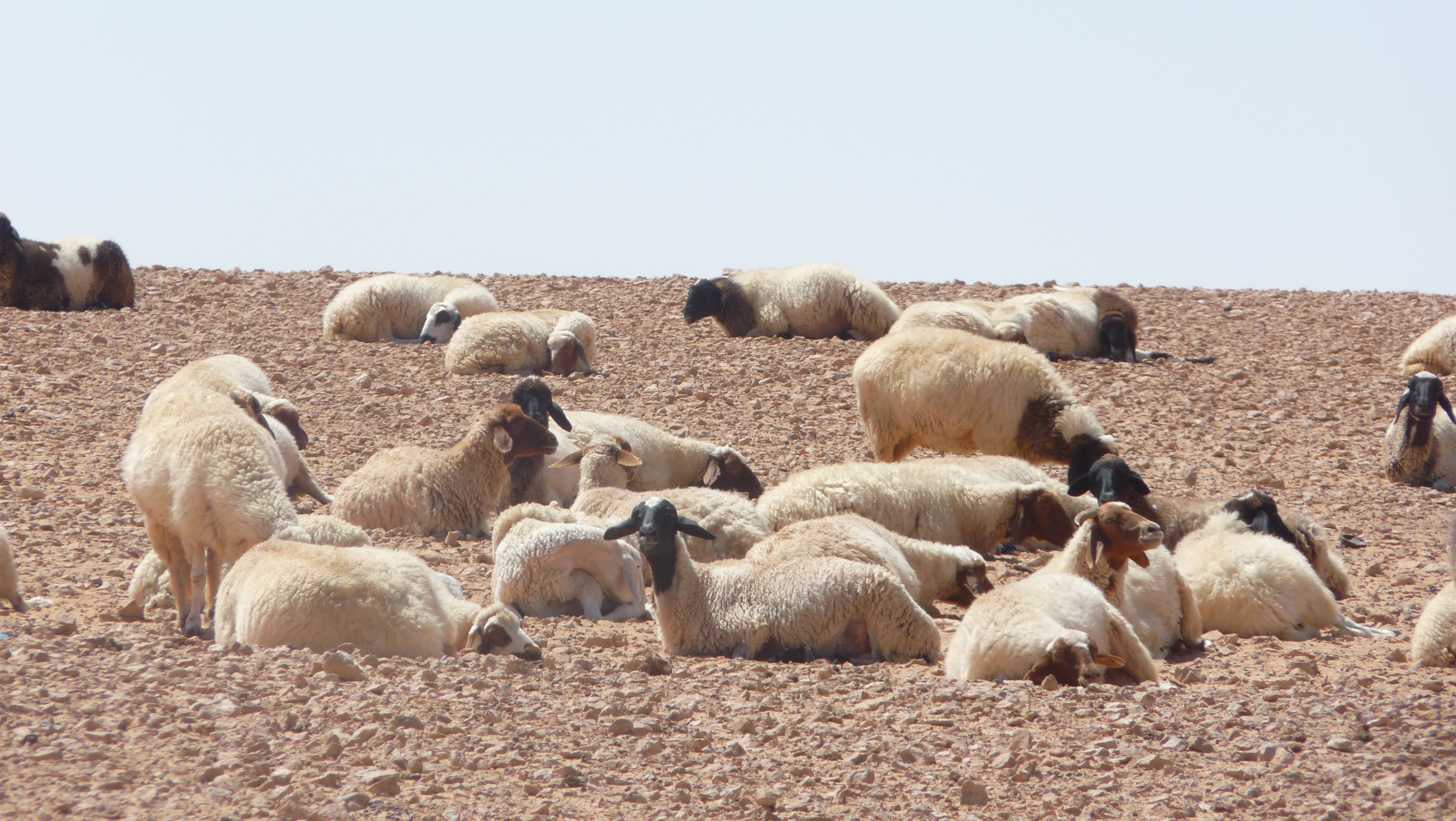
At the oasis of Ksar Ghilane in southern Tunisia

The Tunisian Barbarin is a Tunisian breed of fat-tailed sheep. It is distributed throughout Tunisia, and on both sides of the Tunisian border with Algeria, on the Algerian side particularly in the area of Oued Souf. Related to the Awassi

== History ==
The Tunisian Barbarin descends from the Near East Fat-tailed. Two Italian breeds, the Barbaresca Siciliana of Sicily and the Laticauda of Calabria and Campania, are derived from it.

In 1991 the total population in Tunisia was reported to be 5 million; in 1992, a population of 50 000 was reported in Algeria. In 2008, the Barbarin constituted about 60% of the overall sheep population in Tunisia, which was estimated to count approximately 4 million ewes.

== Characteristics ==
The Barbarin is a coarse-wool breed, and is reared mainly for meat. It is particularly well adapted to the intense heat of desert areas, and can tolerate brackish water. The coat is white, and the face is either brick-red or black. The black face gives the animal better resistance to sunlight and to photosensitivity caused by eating Hypericum perforatum, "St. John's Wort".

Apart from the two principal types, a further eight sub-populations have been identified within the breed. These include an all-black variant, and two "spectacled" sub-types with a white head and patches of colour only around the eyes and round the muzzle: the black-spectacled type is called sardi, and the red-spectacled one, sagaa.
