= Delaine Merino =

Breed of sheep

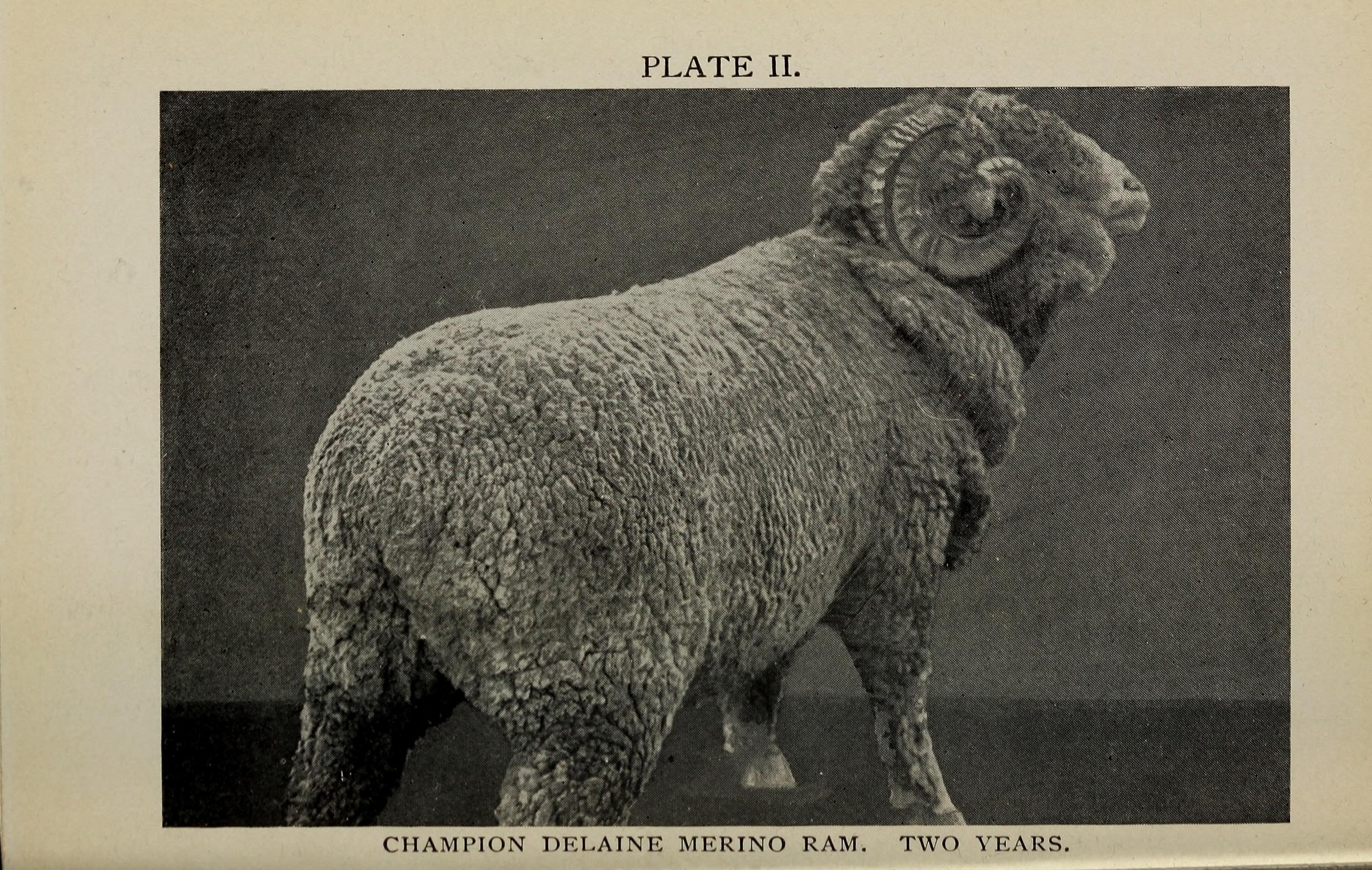
Champion Delaine Merino ram, two years old.

The Delaine Merino is a type of Merino sheep predominant in North America. It has fewer skin wrinkles than some types of Merino, but still has a fine, oily fleece that extends through the legs. They are hardy and long–lived, with an ability to thrive on the arid ranges of the Southwest United States. This breed originated in Spain, and is raised primarily for wool production.

Delaine has become a most practical Merino sheep on the average farm and is especially adapted to range sheep production in the Western and Southwestern states. They are found throughout the United States at all altitudes. This particular breed is very common within Australia and New Zealand for wool production.

== See also ==
- Debouillet sheep
- Delaine (cloth)
