= Île-de-France sheep =

Breed of sheep

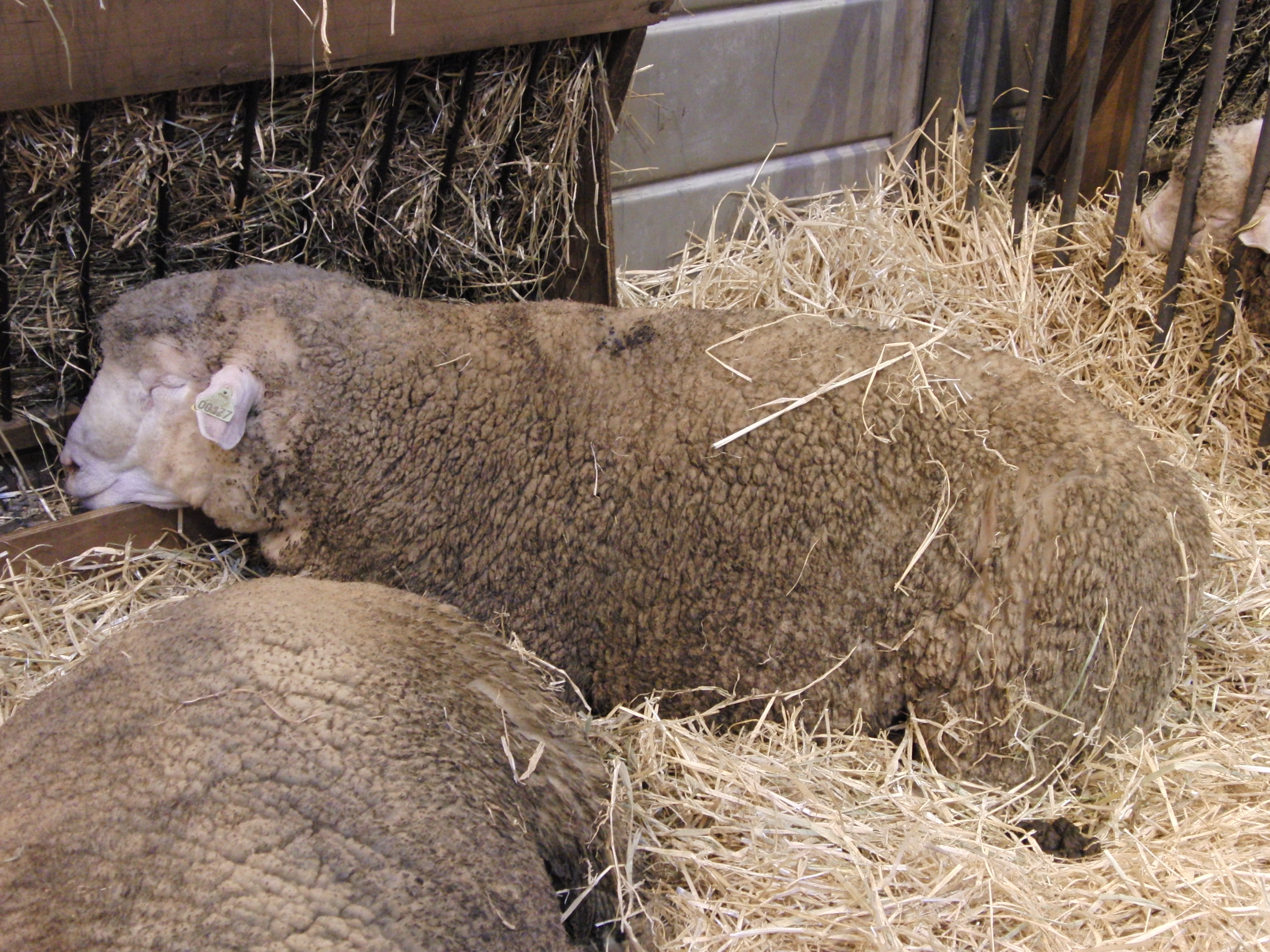
Île-de-France sheep - Paris International Agricultural Show 2011, Paris, France

The Île-de-France is a breed of sheep native to the French region of Île-de-France near Paris. It was first developed at a French veterinary college in the 1830s through crosses of Dishley Leicester and Rambouillet, and was originally known as the Dishley Merino. A breed association was formed in 1933, and it was rigorously tested early on its breeding for meat characteristics and maternal qualities.

Today the Île-de-France is one of the top meat breeds worldwide, and is present in South Africa, Australia and the Americas as well as in Europe. It is primarily used as a terminal sire, but is also occasionally found as a dairy breed in the United States. It's a large, naturally polled breed with white fleece.
