= Agriculture in Wales =

Cultivation of plants and animals in Wales

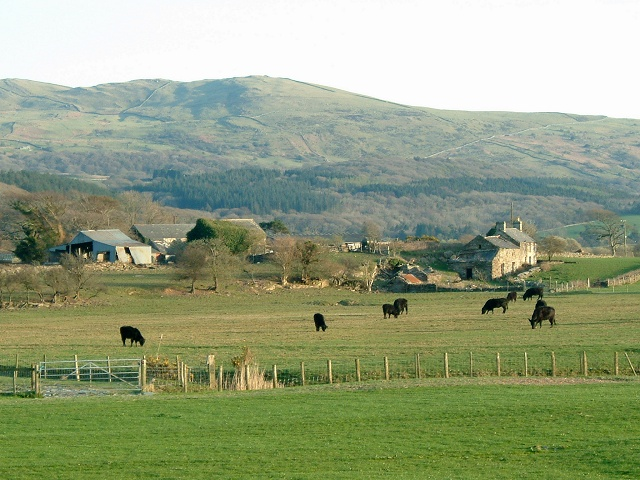
Hill farm with Welsh Black cattle

Agriculture has in the past been a major part of the economy of Wales, a largely rural country which is part of the United Kingdom. Wales is mountainous and has a mild, wet climate. This results in only a small proportion of the land area being suitable for arable cropping, but grass for the grazing of livestock is present in abundance. As a proportion of the national economy, agriculture is now much less important; a high proportion of the population now live in the towns and cities in the south of the country and tourism has become an important form of income in the countryside and on the coast. Arable cropping is limited to the flatter parts and elsewhere dairying and livestock farming predominate.

Holdings in Wales tend to be small family farms. Arable crops and horticulture are limited to southeastern Wales, the Welsh Marches, the northeastern part of the country, the coastal fringes and larger river valleys. Eighty percent of the country is classified as being in a "Less favoured area" for farming. Dairying takes place on improved pasture in lowland areas and beef cattle and sheep are grazed on the uplands and more marginal land.

Much of the land at higher elevations is extensive sheepwalk country and is grazed by hardy Welsh Mountain sheep that roam at will. As with other parts of the United Kingdom, farming has been under great pressure, leading to fewer people being employed on the land, the amalgamation of holdings and an increase in part-time farming. Farmhouses have been used for bed-and-breakfast or converted into self-catering accommodation, and farmers have diversified into tourism-related and other activities. Agriculture in Wales was heavily subsidised by the European Union's Common Agricultural Policy, and the Welsh government has introduced several schemes designed to encourage the farming community to co-operate in caring for their land in an environmentally sustainable way.

== Overview ==
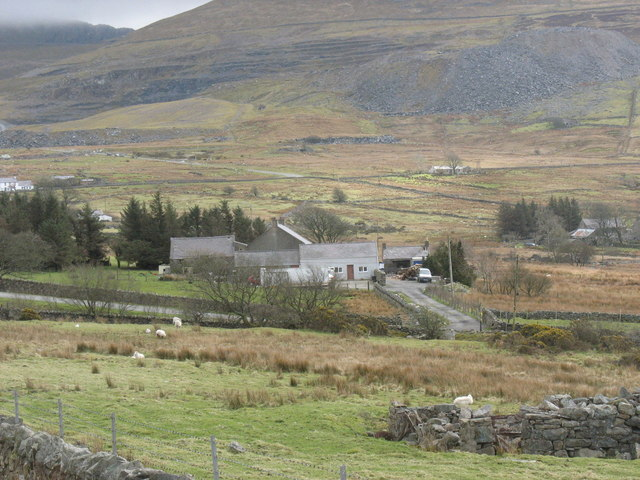
Hill farm in a "Less favoured area"

The climate and topography of Wales is such that there is little arable land, and livestock farming has traditionally been the focus of agriculture. Wales is formed from an exposed mountainous region over 2,000 ft (600 m) in the northwest of the country, encompassing much of what is now Gwynedd, and an upland area of acidic moorland between 600 and 2,000 ft (200 and 600 m), with a coastal strip of flatter but still undulating land. This consists of the Vale of Glamorgan, Monmouthshire, the Welsh Marches, Flintshire and Denbighshire, the coastal plain of North Wales, the island of Anglesey, the coastal plain on Cardigan Bay and Pembrokeshire, and these are the main arable cropping areas. The mild Atlantic climate with predominantly westerly winds give the country a high rainfall; in the uplands there may be 80 in (203 cm) or more, and on the coast 50 in (127 cm).

Compared with other parts of the United Kingdom, Wales has the smallest percentage of arable land (6%), and a considerably smaller area of rough grazing and hill land than Scotland (27% against 62%). The dairy industry is concentrated in more favourable parts of the country, while livestock is raised in the upland areas, with the mountainous areas being used extensively for sheep farming. There are 1,600,000 hectares (4,000,000 acres) of farmland in Wales and eighty percent of the country is classified as being in what was defined for the purposes of government grants to farms as a "Less favoured area" for agriculture.

== History ==
=== Pre-Roman ===
When people returned to Wales after the last ice age, they did not know how to farm. It took until about 4000-3000 BC for them to learn. The Neolithic age saw Welsh peoples in very different positions depending on where they live. In some places, people still lived in caves. The Bronze Age was much unlike the Neolithic, because of the extent that people were farming. Many attribute this to the Bell Beaker culture coming to Wales. The Iron Age featured many new inventions to improve Welsh agriculture. One of these inventions was the Iron Ploughshare, which was an advanced type of Plough. This invention was credited to the Celts.

=== Post-Roman ===
Between 400 and 800 AD, after the demise of the Roman Empire in Britain, land was cleared of forest in Wales, implying an expansion of agriculture.

In the Middle Ages, land was to some extent held collectively in South Wales, as in feudal England, with villages surrounded by ridge-and-furrow open fields. In contrast, in North Wales, farmers living in the same hamlet may have co-operated to the extent of sharing plough teams, but land was held by individuals. Throughout the Middle Ages, sheep were less significant than hardy upland cattle. Welsh medieval land holdings, however, were disrupted by partible inheritance (where all the land was shared amongst all the sons of a landowner), creating small farms which often sank into poverty. Partible inheritance was abolished by Parliament in 1542.

By Early Modern times, the feudal system of South Wales collapsed and the open fields were enclosed piecemeal, by agreement between the affected farmers, leaving a countryside of independent farms. In the North, farmers continued to live in hamlets, which according to a 15th-century account consisted of nine houses all making use of "one plough team, one kiln, one churn, one cat, one cock and one herdsman."

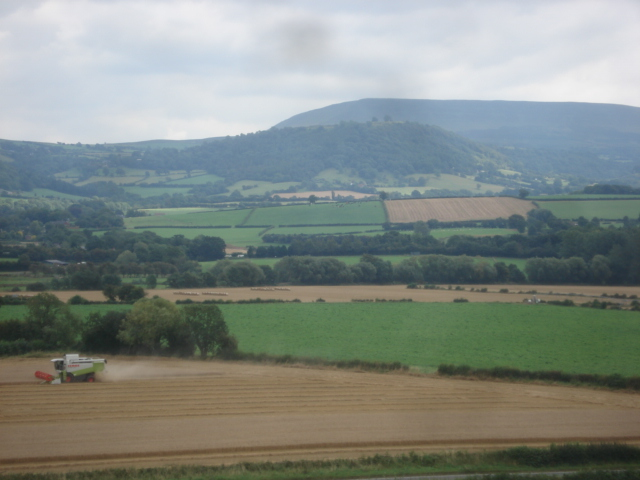
Corn being harvested near Llowes

The main farm animal in the lowlands remained cattle until the 18th century. In the uplands, sheep were kept, and if any cereal was grown, it was oats. Transhumance was practised, people moving with their animals from a low-lying "hendre" farm in winter, to an upland "hafod" farmhouse in summer. Transhumance declined through the 18th century and collapsed at its end as land was enclosed, both upland and lowland. Over 81,000 hectares of Welsh common land was rapidly enclosed and attached to existing landholdings between 1793 and 1815.

In 1801, the population of Wales was 587 thousand, and most of these would have been living in rural areas and employed in agriculture. By 1911, the population had swelled to 2.4 million, more than half of whom lived in Glamorgan and Monmouthshire, where they were employed in mining, steel and other industries. There was a shift away from the land with many dwellers in the rural west emigrating in the 1830s and 1840s and migrating to the cities in the second half of the nineteenth century. By 1911, agriculture was a minor industry in Glamorgan, and migrant labour from England was needed to help get in the harvest. Rural craftsmen were also lost and their supply was replenished from depressed areas of southwestern England and by mass immigration from Ireland.

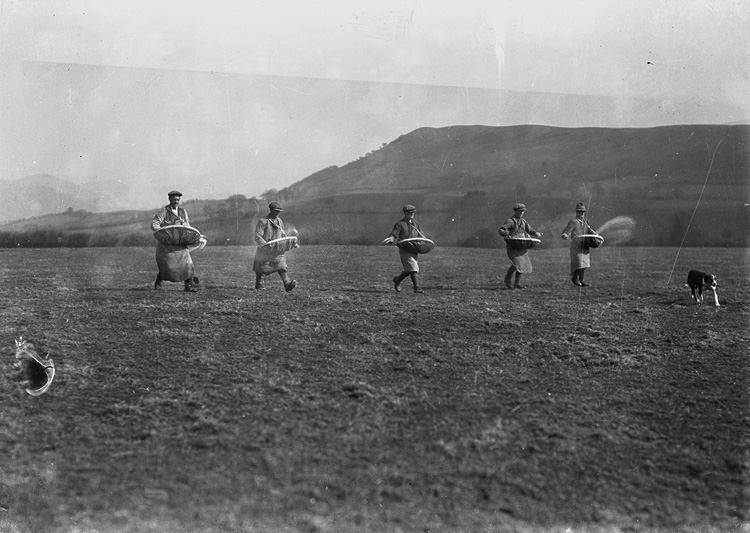
Welsh farm labourers sowing seed, c. 1940s

Much of the land was in the possession of large landowners and let out to tenant farmers in holdings of less than 100 acres (40 ha), often with buildings in a poor state of repair. Tenants were too poor to pay higher rents so landowners were loath to make improvements such as land drainage.

In 1914, there were 2,258,000 acres (914,000 ha) acres of permanent grassland and 340,000 acres (140,000 ha) of corn in Wales. There were 86,000 horses used for agricultural purposes, 807,000 head of cattle, 237,000 pigs and 3,818,000 sheep.

In 2014, in Wales there were 1,048,000 hectares under permanent grass, a further 437,000 hectares were rough grassland, 87,000 hectares were woodland and 239,000 hectares were arable land (including temporary grassland). The number of horses for agricultural purposes are not mentioned in the statistics, but there were 290,000 dairy cows, 214,000 other cattle, 28,400 pigs and 9,739,000 sheep in the country. There were also 945 arable and horticultural holdings, 1,753 dairy farms, 12,650 beef and sheep farms, 95 specialist pig units and 426 specialist poultry units.

Agriculture in Wales was heavily subsidised by the European Union's Common Agricultural Policy, with farmers getting annual payments for the area they farm. Farm incomes have fallen over the years as a result of cheap food policies in the United Kingdom, the lowering of world commodity prices and the removal of production-based subsidies. Particularly hard hit have been the incomes of hill farms in Wales which averaged £15,000 in 2014, as against £23,000 for lowland livestock farms and £59,000 for dairy farms.

== Types of farming ==
=== Crop farming ===
Arable crops grown in Wales include wheat, barley, rapeseed oil and maize for fodder. New potatoes from the Gower peninsula and Pembrokeshire are available early in the season. Horticulture is in long-term decline, with the area of land under cultivation for potatoes, vegetables, soft fruit and orchards having halved since the 1960s to about 30,000 hectares (74,000 acres). In general, Wales produces only about 20% of the horticultural produce eaten in the country.

Organic farming now covers more than 35,000 hectares (86,000 acres) of Wales. The horticultural products most widely-grown organically include potatoes, brassicas and salad crops. Welsh organic milk is marketed as well as organic cheeses and yoghurts.

=== Livestock farming ===
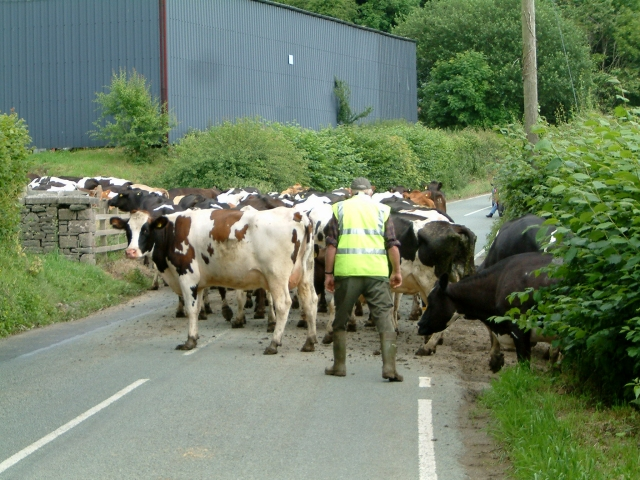
Cows about to be milked near Abercynllaith, Powys

Dairying is only economic in Wales with a sufficiently large herd in a productive lowland area. Hand-milking a few cows in a byre is a thing of the past and nowadays herds are milked by machine in modern parlours, two or three times a day. The milk passes by pipeline to the cooler and is stored in a refrigerated bulk tank and collected by milk tanker daily. In general, the cows graze outdoors in summer and spend their winter under cover, often in cubicles, the bulk of their feed being silage. Milk prices barely cover the costs of production, margins are tight, and there are fewer family-run dairy farms each year. In 2014, there were 1855 milk-producers in Wales, an annual decline of 1.23% since 2011, but the number of cows milked was nearly static at 223,000. By April 2018 the number of dairy producers in Wales had fallen further, to 1723, but the number of dairy cows (2 years old or more) had increased to 301,400 by June 2017.

Lowland livestock farms concentrate largely on beef cattle and various breeds of sheep, but there are also small units producing rarer animals including goats, deer, alpaca, guanaco, llama, buffalo and ostrich, as well as specialised pig and poultry farms. Most cattle are now housed in winter with their main feed being silage. Systems adopted include suckler cows, where the calf is reared by its mother, and the buying in, and growing on, of young beef cattle. Some of these are crossbred calves, a by-product of the dairy industry, where the dairy cow is put to a Charolais, Limousin, Angus, Hereford or similar beef bull. Many of these "stores" are later sold to other parts of the United Kingdom for fattening. The beef sector in Wales is in slow decline; in 2017 there were some 167,828 beef cattle aged over two years in Wales, down from 220,000 in 2011.

Upland and hill farms provide grazing for hardy breeds of cattle like Welsh Blacks and for Welsh Mountain sheep. The cattle are normally housed in winter and may graze the open hillside in summer. The trampling of their hooves helps control bracken and they feed on a wide range of vegetation and on coarse tufts of grass that sheep cannot tackle. The sheep are mostly "hefted" on the unfenced open hillside all year round. Here they know their way around, know where to graze at different times of year and where to shelter. The male lambs are used for meat and most of the females are retained on the hill as flock replacements. Aged ewes are moved to lower elevations and crossed with lowland rams to produce Welsh mule ewes, which are then used for breeding.

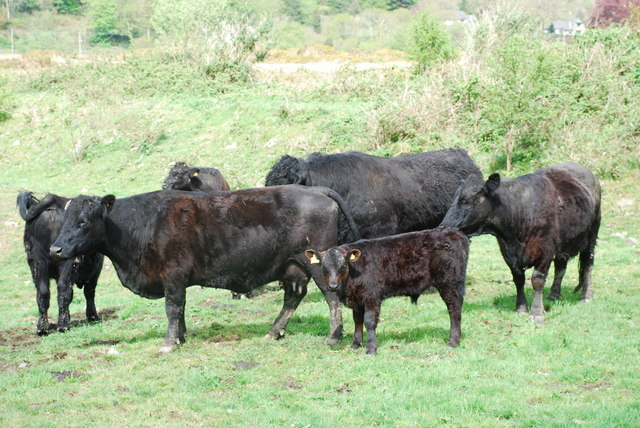
Welsh Black suckler cows with their calves near Penmaenpool

In 2017, there were 1,137,399 cattle in Wales including 251,176 dairy cows and 167,828 beef cows, two years old or over. The poultry flock totalled 7,741,955 birds.

Welsh Black cattle are the traditional breed of Wales. These hardy cows with horns and shaggy coats are able to thrive on poor quality pasture and moorland and can be used to provide both milk and beef. Large numbers were raised in Wales and herded on foot to be fattened in England for selling in English markets. On Welsh farms they were used to pull ploughs and sometimes wagons during the nineteenth century, and were the prized possessions by which a man's wealth could be estimated. Nowadays, many have been crossed with Charolais, Limousin or Hereford bulls but pure bred herds can still be found in many parts of the uplands.

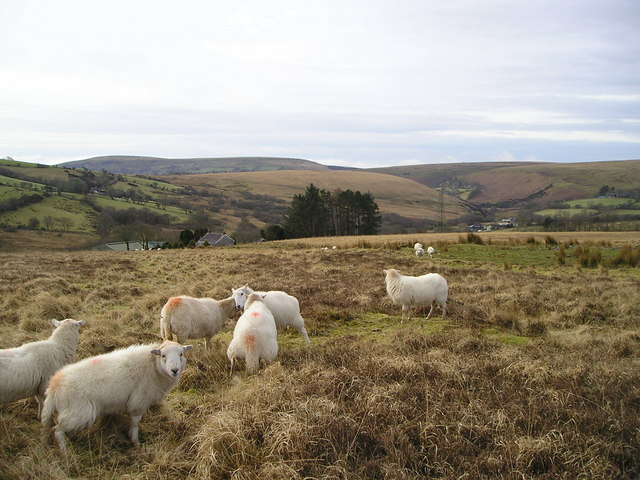
Welsh Mountain sheep on tussocky grassland

The Welsh Mountain sheep is a hardy breed that can scrape a living from the mountainous habitats where they spend the whole year. Being adept at exploiting their environment, they have local knowledge of their mountains and are left to their own devices, being gathered once or twice a year. Originally often horned, and various shades of brown or black, they were often of poor conformation and bedraggled appearance. More recently, scientific breeding has improved them and they have been exported to many parts of the world. They form part of the ancestry of various local breeds of sheep in Wales, the Llanwenog, the Lleyn sheep, the Kerry Hill, the badger-faced, the Welsh mule and the Beulah speckle-faced. In rural areas, sheep are still an important part of life with local livestock shows and sheep dog trials taking place annually.

Pigs are not one of the main forms of livestock on Welsh farms though there are some specialised units. They used to be kept in small numbers on farms and by rural and urban cottagers. In the twentieth century, many miners in the South Wales valleys still kept a pig in a backyard sty, to be killed for production of fresh and salt pork, bacon, faggots and black pudding. In 2017, there were 24,503 pigs, less than half the number that were present at the start of the century.

== Agriculture today ==
The labour force has been dwindling for many years as a result of increased mechanisation and changes in farming practices. Fewer farmers are needed today because they are able to produce more food from their land. Hay is no longer the main source of winter feed for livestock and has largely been replaced by silage, particularly baled silage wrapped in film that can be handled mechanically. This has reduced the manpower needed on farms, and there has been an increase of use by farmers of specialised contractors who provide services in silage making, harvesting and fencing. Another problem facing Welsh farmers is their distance from the main distribution centres used by supermarkets which are mostly located near centres of population in England.

To increase their incomes, many farmers have diversified; the average income from non-farming business activities on farms in Wales in 2013/2014 was £4,900. Tourism-related activities accounted for much of this; these included bed and breakfast accommodation, self-catering accommodation in redundant outbuildings or purpose-built units, bunkhouses for walkers and provision of food-related services in cafés, restaurants, farm shops, pick-your-own and farmer's markets. Indoor and outdoor leisure and recreational facilities are provided by some farmers including paint-balling, laser-combat games, pony trekking, mountain biking and many other activities. Caravans, camp sites and parking provide alternative uses for land, and wind turbines can provide extra income from land still farmed in the normal way.

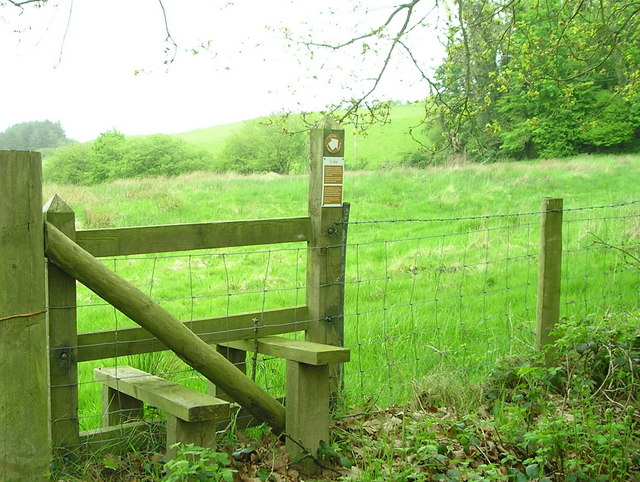
Footpath made available for use by the public as part of a Tir Gofal scheme

Changes in farming practices, especially the drainage of land, the more intensive use of grassland and the removal of hedgerows, has affected wildlife in Wales. The causes of the decline are complex and factors such as climate change also play a part. There have been various initiatives over the years designed to help farmers diversify and farm in an environmentally friendly fashion. Tir Cymen was a scheme that aimed to preserve traditional landscapes and it was followed by Tir Gofal, which encouraged the creation of ponds and wetlands, the planting of woodland and the preservation of hedgerows. Both of these are now closed to new entrants. One initiative is Glastir, more objective than the previous schemes, offering financial support to participants, intended to combat climate change, improve water management and maintain and enhance biodiversity.

In 2024 the Welsh Government set out its "Sustainable Farming Scheme" which aims to provide support for farmers in Wales while benefiting the environment. Among other things, it had been proposed to mandate additional areas of forestry on Wales's farms, but this was dropped in November 2024.

=== Effects of Brexit ===
During Brexit negotiations in 2020, trade union NFU Cymru president John Davies emphasised that the European market was of "supreme importance" to the farming industry of Wales. 35-40% of Welsh lamb is sold to the continental mainland of Europe whilst 55-60% is sold to other countries in the UK and 5% is sold within Wales itself. Liz Truss claimed that the farming industry would "thrive" with or without an EU trade deal.

In 2021 the UK Chancellor announced that Wales would receive £252.19 million for agricultural support in 2022/23, which would replace the Common Agricultural Policy funding from the EU. The Welsh government says that Welsh farmers would be losing £106 million, in addition to a loss of £137 million in funding allocated by the UK government the previous year.

According to the Institute for Government, the UK government has committed to maintaining the current levels of farm funding until the end of the parliamentary term in 2024. In the autumn 2021 spending review, the UK government allocated funding to the Welsh government to allow the maintenance of the current levels of spending on farms until 2024–25. The FUW trade union however, has calculated that Wales will be £225m worse off over the current parliament due to not using up all of EU funding. Managing director of the FUW said “It is political games. We take the view that the Westminster government is guilty of breaching a manifesto promise that it would match spending pound for pound".

As of December 2022, agriculture remains a devolved competency for Wales and the replacement for the common agricultural policy is still being designed with farmers in Wales continuing to receive direct payments. Journalist Lisa O'Carroll says that Brexit has caused a loss of unhindered access to the EU single market and potential reduction in farm subsidies following the loss of the common agricultural policy of the EU. She also suggests that Welsh farmers are disadvantaged by new trade deals that give Australia and New Zealand farmers access to UK markets.

== Sources ==
- Pryor, Francis (2011) [2010]. The Making of the British Landscape: How We Have Transformed the Land, from Prehistory to Today. Penguin. ISBN 978-0-141-04059-2.
- Lynch, Frances (1995). Gwynedd. London: H.M.S.O. ISBN 0-11-701574-1.
- Jones, J. Graham (2014). The history of Wales. Cardiff, Wales : University of Wales Press. ISBN 978-1-78316-169-0.
