= Sheep farming in Wales =

Farming in Wales

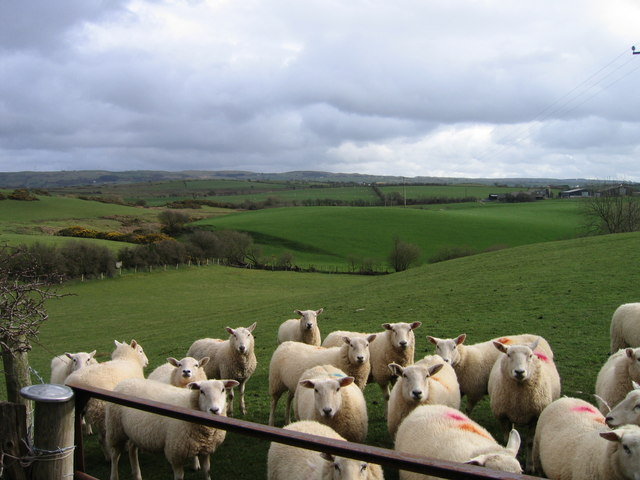
Sheep in a field near Aberystwyth

Sheep farming is an environmental issue in Wales. Much of the nation is rural countryside and sheep are farmed throughout Wales. The woollen industry in Wales was a major contributor to the national economy, accounting for two-thirds of the nation's exports in 1660. Sheep farms are most often situated in the country's mountains and moorlands, where sheepdogs are employed to round up flocks. Sheep are also reared, however, along the south and west coasts of Wales. In 2017 there were more than 10 million sheep in Wales and the total flock made up nearly 33% of the British total. In 2011 sheep farming accounted for 20% of agriculture in Wales.

== Historical development ==
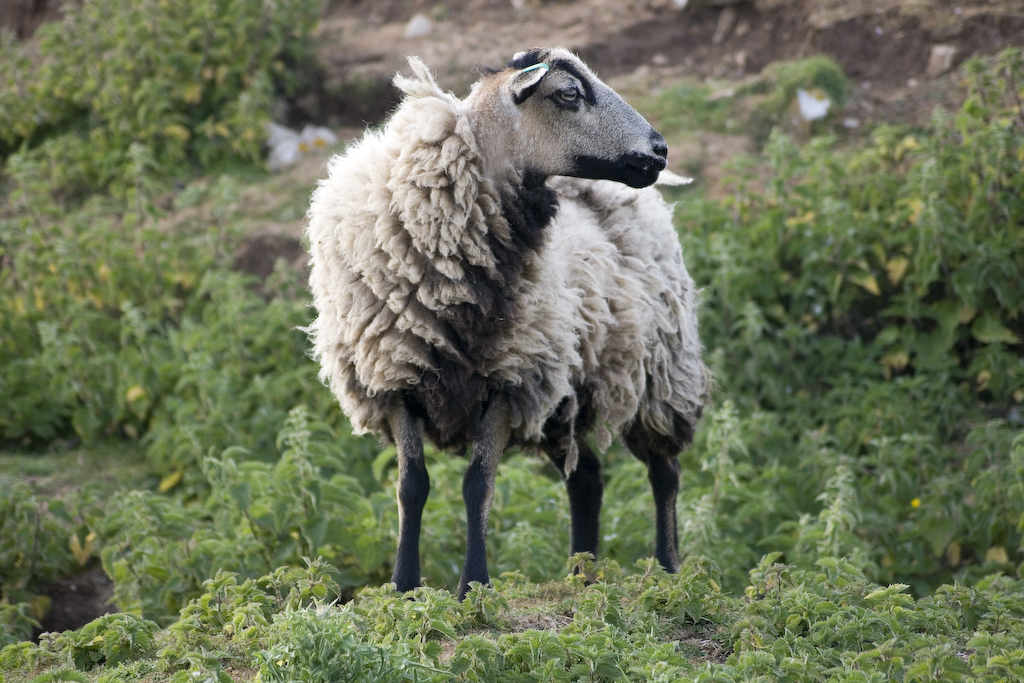
A Badger Face Welsh Mountain ewe on Flat Holm

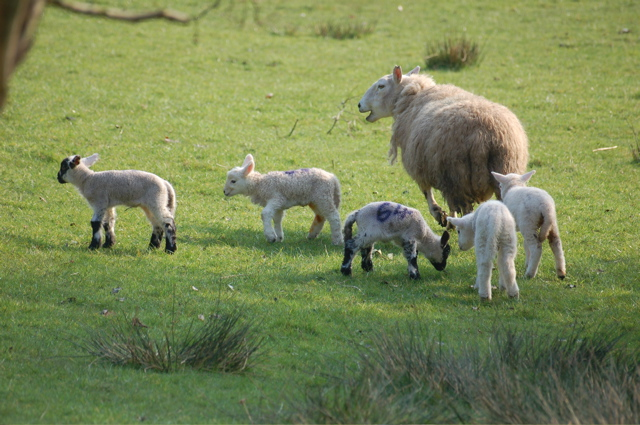
Sheep and lambs near Brecon in early spring

Sheep farming has been important to the economy of Wales. Sheep farming is an ancient husbandry activity in rural parts of Wales where the climate and soil conditions were not suitable for growing crops other than oats. The activity is documented from medieval times, by which time white sheep probably imported by the Romans had interbred with native dark-fleeced types to produce varieties of Welsh Mountain sheep. Initially, sheep were bred for their milk and fleeces, rather than their meat.

By the 13th century, sheep farming in Wales had become a major industry and source of income, largely from wool, much of which was exported. Large flocks of sheep were owned by Cistercian abbeys and monasteries, such as those at Strata Florida, Margam, Basingwerk and Tintern. The woollen industry in Wales was a major contributor to the national economy, accounting for two-thirds of the nation's exports in 1660.However, large-scale sheep rearing on the higher moors of Wales, such as those in Denbighshire, is only believed to have developed within the last 300 years. Sheep farmers often practiced transhumance, with part of each household moving to live in the hills with the sheep during the summer; later, their seasonal hillside hafods or dwellings became permanent homes. In the past, grazing rights were determined by local courts.

Historically, Welsh sheep were shorn twice in the year. Besides the regular shearing in May or June, the wool was clipped close about the neck and forequarters at Michaelmas, otherwise all of it would have been lost before the following summer in the wanderings of the animal among the thickets and furze in search of food during winter and spring.

Glamorganshire mountain sheep wandered over the countryside from early times, some being horned and others being polled. In the 1840s, Youatt described the sheep of Glamorganshire: "Some are nearly white, and others are between a dirty white and a perfect black. The head is small; the neck long, erect, and delicate; the fore-quarters light, with narrow breast and shoulders; the sides flat; the back and loins narrow; the legs slight and long; the animals possessing considerable agility. The fleece weighs about 2 pounds (0.91 kg). On the Gelligaer and Eglwysilan mountains the quality of the wool is fine; but on the hills lying on the western side of the Taff valley it is kempy, which deteriorates its value. The breech wool is still more hairy and coarse." Dre-fach Felindre in the Teifi valley became known as the "Huddersfield of Wales" when the wool industry was prosperous there.

In the 1840s, the hills of Montgomeryshire included flocks from the low country. Towards the south and west, a smaller white-faced breed was more prevalent while in the north-east a black-faced native breed was found. The breed in the valleys had been improved, principally by sheep from Shropshire. The sheep on the higher grounds weighed about 10 lbs. the quarter, while those in the valleys weighed 12 to 14 lbs. The lambing season at that time was in March and lambs were shorn in August. There were fewer sheep in Denbighshire and Flintshire, particularly in Flintshire, than in any of the other counties, and these were mixed with English breeds. Their weight varied between 10 and 20 lbs. per quarter, and the fleece from 2 to 5 lbs.

== Husbandry and economics ==
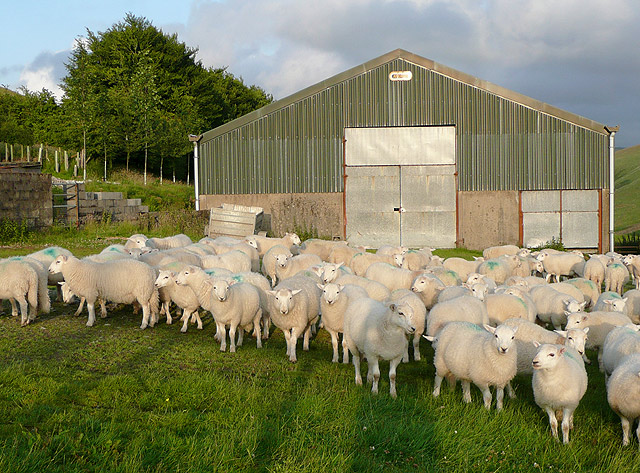
Sheep at Ty'n-y-Cornel farm, near Tregaron in West Wales

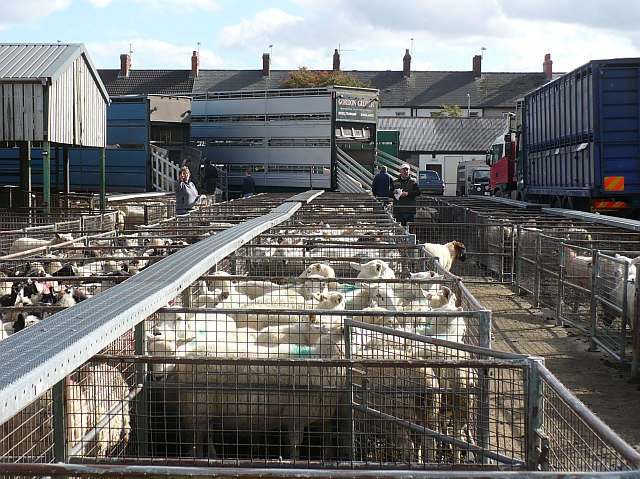
Sheep auction at the Cattle Market in Newport, which closed in 2009 after 165 years of trading

Twenty per cent of all agricultural work is made up by sheep farming. There are over 11 million sheep in the entire country.Breeds favoured by modern wool producers, which originate from Wales, include the Badger Face Welsh Mountain, the Balwen Welsh Mountain and the Black Welsh Mountain.

Sheep farming in the mountains of Wales is an arduous task, particularly when the traditional techniques of farming are followed. The activities of sheep farming start with growing grass on the meadows, buying hay from external sources and stacking them. The season starts with the birth of the lambs during spring and continues with feeding, caring, shearing and transportation to market centers, maintaining the fencing around the pens, and taking care of the deserted young lambs or injured lambs. Farms are mostly under small farmers and it is one individual who bears most responsibilities. The sheep farmers' best support is the sheepdog for moving the flocks to better ground or to wintering areas in the valleys, and even in giving them organic treatments in the form of injections and treatments.

In recent years, sheep farming has become less profitable to the farmers for many reasons including the falling prices of lamb meat, weather conditions, the loss of more than one million breeding ewes between 2001 and 2009 and global warming. The threat of the United Kingdom withdrawing from the European Union is also a fear for the farmers of Welsh as they anticipate "doom the Welsh sheep industry". The EU support to the Welsh rural community is reported to be of the order of about half a billion euros a year. The loss on this account could be an additional burden of £40 per lamb on the farmers. Government support has been sought in the way of subsidies and technical support.Disaster struck parts of Wales in March 2013 when the coldest weather experienced in 50 years caused the deaths of many sheep and lambs and hardship to sheep farmers.

According to the Welsh Government:

"Food production is part of the fabric of Wales and the Welsh economy. In 2011 the sheep sector was worth £270 million – 20 per cent of the gross agricultural output of Wales. But of course its value to Wales goes far beyond its financial worth. Its role in sustaining rural and upland communities and their position as part of our social and cultural fabric is priceless."

== Environmental impact ==
The economic viability of sheep farming in Wales is highly dependent upon the single farm payment given by European taxpayers to people who own land on condition they keep it in "Good Agricultural and Environmental Condition". However, this requires the removal of unwanted vegetation such as wild plants. The writer George Monbiot claims that sheep farming practices and grazing prevents natural trees and shrubs from growing and the subsequent fauna associated with such ecosystems flourishing, and that sheep compact the soil contributing to a cycle of flood and drought, thereby restricting the productivity of more fertile lands downstream. Wales imports seven times as much meat as it exports despite 76% of the land in Wales being devoted to livestock farming.

The RSPB's State of Nature report found that 60% of animal and plant species in Wales have declined over the last 50 years and 31% have declined strongly with farming practices being blamed for loss of habitats.However, the National Farmers' Union (NFU) said it was "unfair to conveniently lay the blame on farming". NFU Cymru president Ed Bailey said that “many farmers and visitors to the countryside will be surprised about the report's findings given the huge effort farmers now place on managing the environment".

Greenhouse gas fluxes from soils are hard to understand, but the largest single greenhouse gas emission by sheep is them belching methane. This is measured with portable accumulation chambers, and breeding for less is being attempted. Methane suppressing feed is being tried, and considered by the Welsh government. However a 2024 study estimated that although it might be possible to reduce greenhouse gas emissions by about a third, sheep farms in total cannot reach net zero without carbon sequestration, for example by growing more trees. However the study says that planting trees may not be suitable for all sheep farms. Much lamb is exported and it has been suggested that less should be produced.

== Cultural significance ==
The National Wool Museum of Wales is located in Dre-fach Felindre, near Llandysul in Carmarthenshire and is part of the National Museum Wales. After refurbishing, the museum was reopened in 2004. Sheep farming is closely associated with Wales culturally and is often the subject of "lewd jokes and anti-Welsh sentiment" especially by the English.
