= Welsh Mountain =

Welsh Mountain may refer to:

- Welsh Mountain sheep, a type of sheep originating in the Welsh mountains
- Welsh Mountain Pony, the smallest of four types of Welsh Pony, often kept free-ranging on mountains
