= Balwen (disambiguation) =

Balwen may refer to:

- Balwen Welsh Mountain sheep, a variety of sheep from Wales
- King Balwen Mayal, a character in The Wheel of Time fantasy series by Robert Jordan
