= Tir Cymen =

Welsh environmental and preservation programme

Tir Cymen was an environmental and preservation programme in Wales to preserve representative examples of the Welsh landscape. It started in 1992 and new nominations were closed in 1998.

Countryside Council for Wales started the programme in October 1992. Meirionnydd, Dinefwr and Swansea were chosen as representative examples of the wide variety of Welsh landscapes, habitats and farming systems. Four farms were examined in Dinefwr, Carmarthenshire. 17 new archaeological sites were recorded in upland portions, adding to the 5 previously known.

Tir Cymen led to a follow on programme in Wales called Tir Gofal.
