= Black Welsh Mountain =

Breed of sheep

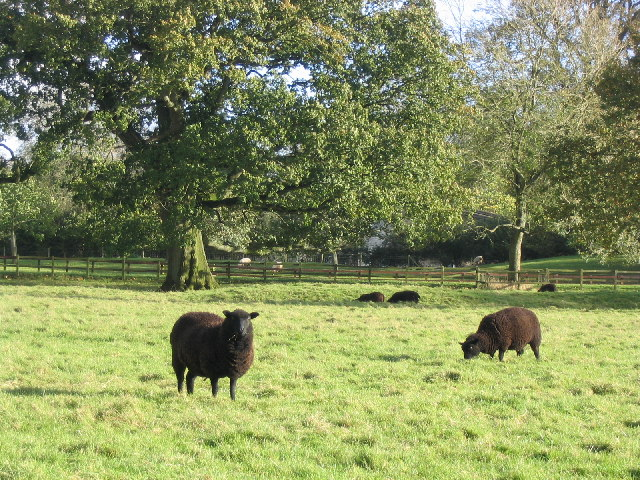
A flock of Black Welsh Mountain sheep

The Black Welsh Mountain (Welsh: Defaid Mynydd Duon, pronounced [ˈdevaɪd ˈmənɪð ˈdɪɔn]) is a colour type of the Welsh Mountain sheep, bred for sheep farming in Wales. It occurs occasionally in flocks of other colours, but is now often maintained as a separate strain. Like other Welsh Mountain sheep it is found mainly on the hills in Wales, but is also kept elsewhere. The worldwide population is approximately 10000. A breed society, the Black Welsh Mountain Sheep Breeders' Association, was formed in 1920 at the Smithfield Show.

Introduced into the United States in 1973 through a single importation of 3 rams and 13 ewes by Mr. Tom Wyman of New York, the fleece from the Black Welsh Mountain has generated special interest among hand spinners and weavers. As only 2 rams survived quarantine, the US flock is genetically descended from these 2 sire lines with only an additional importation of frozen sheep semen in the late 1990s to add some genetic diversity to the US herds. Nine ewes formed the foundation population.

== Characteristics ==
Apart from being wholly black, the Black Welsh Mountain is like other Welsh Mountain sheep – small and hardy with no wool on the face or legs; the males are horned, but females are normally polled. These sheep are known for lambing easily, as well as good milk and very high fertility.

A small number of wild Mouflon sheep were introduced from Sardinia in 1906 and from Corsica in 1908 to Lambay Island (off the coast of Dublin) where they produced offspring. These were crossed with Welsh Black Mountain sheep and the inheritance of their wool-colour studied (Fraser Roberts, A. J. 1931 Colour inheritance in sheep; vi The genetic constitution of the Wild Mouflon, J. Genetics XXV (1)).
