= Zwartbles =

Sheep breed

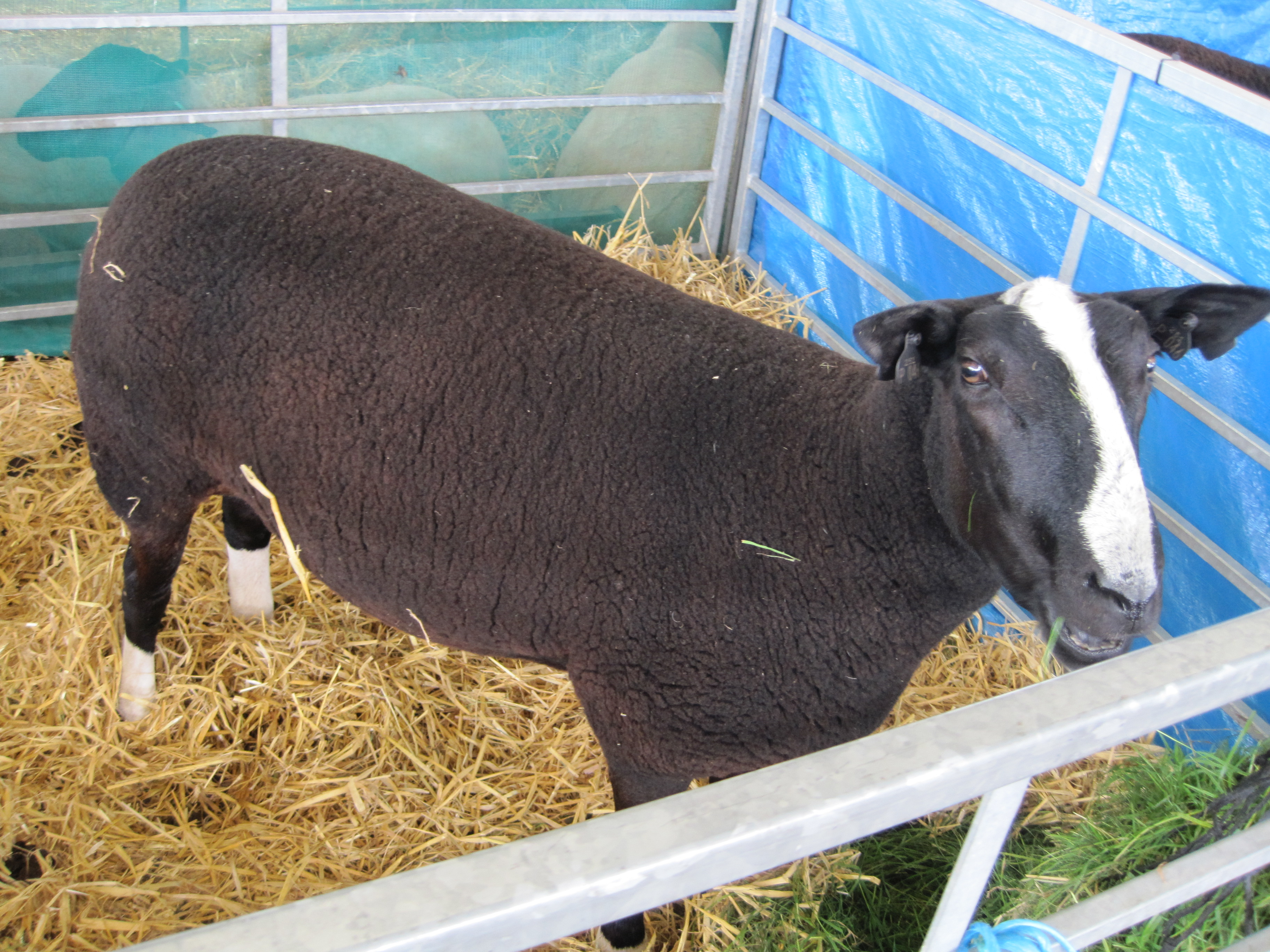
- A Zwartbles Ewe
- Country of origin: Netherlands
- Use: milk and meat

Traits
- Weight: Male: 100 kg (220 lb); Female: 85 kg (187 lb)
- Height: Male: 80 cm; Female: 75 cm
- Wool colour: black/brown
- Face colour: black/brown with a white blaze

The Zwartbles is a breed of domestic sheep originating in the Friesland region of the north Netherlands. There it was primarily used for the production of sheep milk as well as lamb and mutton. They were often kept alongside dairy cattle herds.

== Breed characteristics ==
The Zwartbles has a striking appearance: a black/brown fleece, a white blaze on the face, 2 - 4 white socks, and a white tail tip (which is traditionally left undocked). Both rams and ewes are polled. The Zwartbles are relatively large sheep: ewes weigh an average of 85 kg (187 lb), and rams 100 kg (220 lb). The dense fleece ranges from black to brown with sun bleached tips, some silvering may be present in older animals. The wool is medium to fine with excellent crimp and fibre length, a Bradford count of 54-56 and a micron count of 27 making it popular for spinning and felting.

Zwartbles are known for being docile, friendly, easy lambing, prolific, milky and being excellent mothers. Also they are good in showing.

== History ==
Traditionally used for both milk and meat in the Netherlands, they declined significantly in use until listed as critically rare by the Dutch Rare Breed Survival trust in the mid-1970s.

The first Zwartbles were imported to the United Kingdom in the early 1990s. The UK Zwartbles Sheep Association was formed in 1995.

=== In the UK ===
Zwartbles are now mainly used to produce breeding stock, meat and wool. Being from a cold, wet, windy area of the Netherlands, the breed has easily adapted to the UK climate and can thrive at various altitudes. They are increasingly popular with both smallholders and commercial farmers. As of June 2011 there are over 750 Zwartbles flocks registered with the UK breed society plus many unregistered flocks in the UK.

In the UK, Zwartbles rams are also crossed with ewes of other breeds to produce butchers lambs. Lambs from these crosses are always black but sometimes will have a little white on the head. Zwartbles rams and ewes cross well with other breeds. Many UK agricultural shows now hold classes for Zwartbles. The wool of these show animals is often trimmed to remove the sunbleached (brown) wool tips revealing a tight black fleece.

== See also ==
- Balwen Welsh Mountain sheep, an unrelated breed with a similar colour pattern.
