= Countryside Council for Wales =

Welsh Assembly sponsored body

- Abbreviation: CCW
- Successor: Natural Resources Wales
- Type: Welsh Assembly sponsored body
- Purpose: Conservation
- Location: Cardiff, Swansea, Mold, Newtown
- Official language: English, Welsh
- Budget: £45m (2008)
- Staff: 500

The Countryside Council for Wales (CCW; Welsh: Cyngor Cefn Gwlad Cymru (CCGC)) was a Welsh Assembly sponsored body responsible for wildlife conservation, landscape and countryside access in Wales.

It merged with Forestry Commission Wales, and Environment Agency Wales to form Natural Resources Wales, a single body managing Wales' environment and natural resources, on 1 April 2013.

As a statutory advisory and prosecuting body, the Countryside Council for Wales claims to have 'championed the environment and landscapes of Wales and its coastal waters as sources of natural and cultural riches, as a foundation for economic and social activity, and as a place for leisure and learning opportunities'. Its aim was to 'make the environment a valued part of everyone's life in Wales'.

== See also ==
- List of conservation topics
- Conservation in the United Kingdom
- National nature reserves in Wales
- List of Sites of Special Scientific Interest by Area of Search
- List of Special Areas of Conservation in Wales
- Tir Cymen
