= Balwen =

British breed of sheep

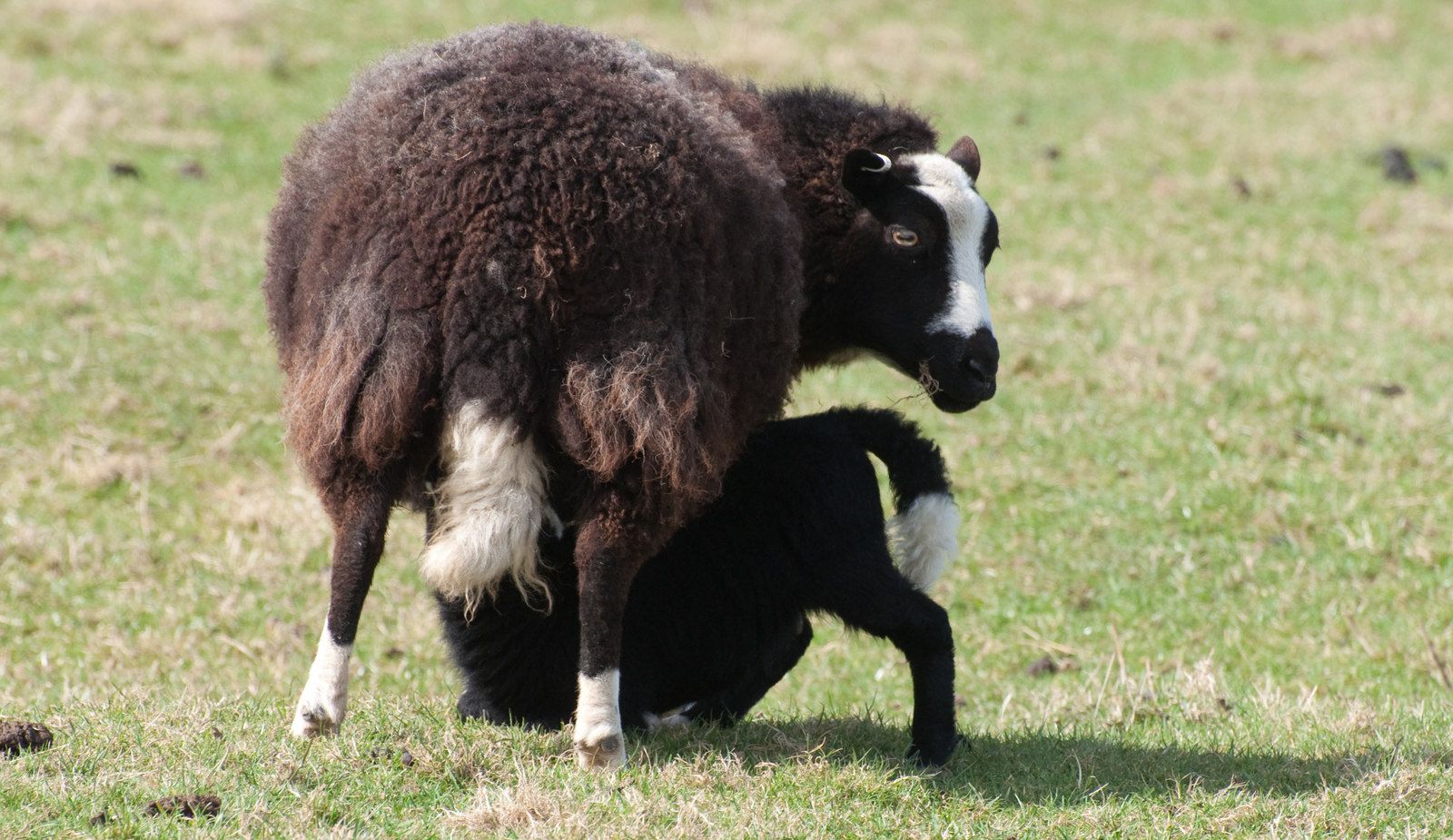
Ewe and lamb

The Balwen is a United Kingdom breed of sheep originating in Wales. It originates in the Tywi valley of Wales and forms part of the Welsh Mountain group of breeds.

It has a distinctive colour pattern: a black body with white extremities. It is reared primarily for meat.

== History ==
The name of the breed derives from the Welsh words bal, 'blaze', and wen, 'white'.

The Balwen originated in one small area of Wales – the Tywi valley. This area was hit badly by the very severe winter of 1946–1947, and the breed was nearly wiped out – only one ram was amongst the survivors. All modern Balwen sheep are therefore presumably descended from this one ram, although it is possible that some of the ewes may have been in lamb to rams that did not survive the winter. Outcrossing with other types of Welsh Mountain sheep may also have occurred, and this would have increased the genetic diversity of the breed. During the 1950s and 1960s a steady increase took place, and in the 1970s people outside the valley began to take an interest in the breed. The Balwen Welsh Mountain Breed Society was formed in 1985, and numbers are gradually increasing further.

The breed is listed by the British Rare Breeds Survival Trust as vulnerable.

== Characteristics ==
The Balwen has a base colour of black, fading to brown in sunlight and greying with age. It has a white blaze on the face, four white feet (referred to as socks), and white covering the last half or more of the tail – the tail is normally left undocked. Otherwise it is of similar type to other Welsh Mountain Sheep. Males have horns, and females are naturally polled.

== Use ==
The Balwen is becoming popular among smallholders and farmers alike, mainly due to its attractive markings, hardiness, ease of care and excellent meat. The ewes make excellent mothers, having very few lambing problems and plenty of milk to feed the lambs. At their first lambing, most ewes have single lambs. But after that, under the right conditions many twin, and some have even reared triplets. The wool is medium-soft, with a staple length of 5–7.5 cm and a fibre diameter of 32.3 μm, and is easy to spin.

== See also ==
- Zwartbles, an unrelated breed with a similar colour pattern
