= Glastir =

Land management scheme in Wales

Glastir (Welsh Green land) is a sustainable land management scheme in Wales launched by the Welsh Assembly Government in 2012. Its goals include "combating climate change, improving water management and maintaining and enhancing biodiversity." It aims to "deliver measurable outcomes at both a farm and landscape level in a cost effective way". The scheme is funded by the Welsh Government and the European Union.

== The scheme ==
Glastir is designed to replace several previous agri-environmental schemes, Tir Gofal, Tir Cynnal, Tir Mynydd, the Organic Farming Scheme and the Organic Farming Conversion Scheme, and Better Woodlands for Wales.

Glastir is a whole-farm land management scheme and is available to any person in Wales who has control of agricultural land or an interest in common land. The scheme involves the participant in committing to a management plan for a period of five years. Most entrants to the scheme will do so under the "Whole Farm Code" that applies to all the agricultural land which forms part of the contract, and the participant will have to comply with all the elements of this code. There are also various options to suit the circumstances of the farm which will provide capital grants for approved projects.

The Glastir structure includes either the "All Wales Element" (AWE) or the "Common Land Element" (CLE). Within these, there are "Targeted Elements" (TE), selected agri-environmental schemes for farms and commons. An option for woodland management and creation is available to all participants. The "Agriculture Carbon Reduction and Efficiency Scheme" (ACRES) is available to provide capital grants for farms under the AWE. Participants need to express an interest in a Targeted Element scheme and the Welsh Government decides which TEs to approve. The TE priorities are reducing carbon emissions, improving water quality and quantity, increasing biodiversity, preserving the historic environment and providing access to the countryside.

== Evaluation ==
When the scheme was set up, the National Farmers Union stated that some farmers in the "Less Favoured Areas" would be worse off than under previous subsidy arrangements but the Welsh Government denied that that was so. In 2014, the Wales Audit Office stated that the scheme had "significant flaws" and made several recommendations on how it might be improved.
