= Abercynllaith =

Coordinates: 52.806709°N 3.186718°W

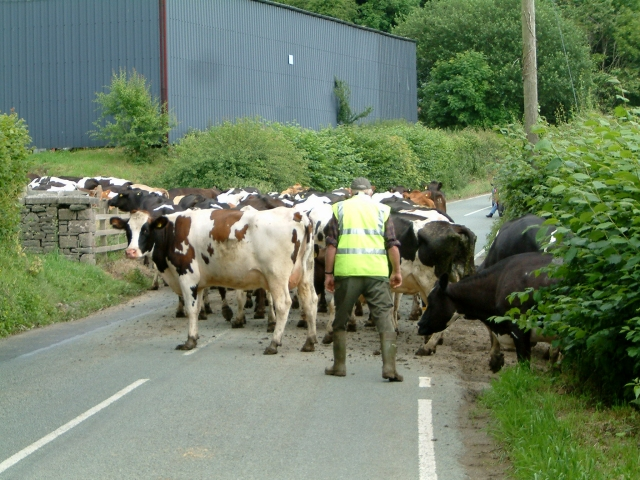
- A local farmer and his cows

- Location within Powys
- Principal area: Powys
- Preserved county: Powys
- Country: Wales
- Sovereign state: United Kingdom
- Police: Dyfed-Powys
- Fire: Mid and West Wales
- Ambulance: Welsh
- UK Parliament: Montgomeryshire and Glyndŵr
- Senedd Cymru – Welsh Parliament: Montgomeryshire

Abercynllaith, also sometimes referred to as Aberkenllith, is a hamlet, between Llangedwyn and Pen-y-bont Llanerch Emrys in northeastern Powys, Wales. It lies to the southwest of Oswestry, Shropshire, along the B4396 road, near the English border.

== Geography ==
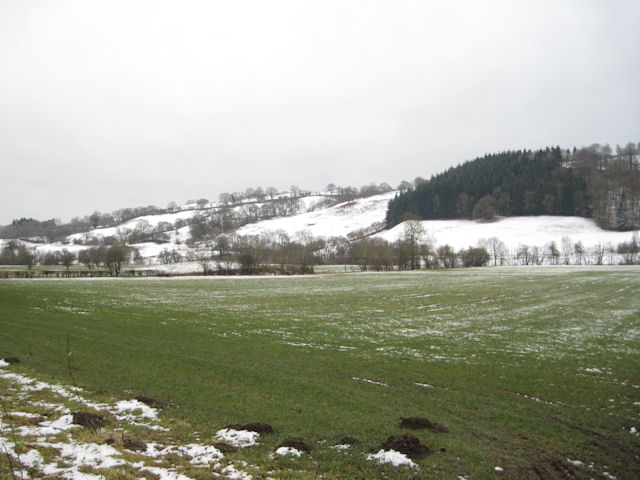
Tanat Valley from opposite Abercynllaith

The Afon Tanat river flows nearby, to the south of Abercynllaith. A wood to the north of the settlement is named Cefn y Coed.

== Landmarks ==
The Graywill Lodge is a 16th-century coach house previously of the Bryn Y Gwalia Hall's out buildings but later converted in the late 1980s. Bryn Y Gwalia Hall is a grander yet still modest larger construction to the left of Graywill Lodge. Bryn Gwalia Cottage is situated to the right of Graywill Lodge, all three properties looking down over the Tanat valley behind the Green Inn. The Green Inn, a Grade II listed building is a public house in the Regency or early Victorian Tudor style. In 1838 it was documented to have been tenanted by Jane Jones, and belonging to the estate of John Bonnor. It was known at the time as the Green Public House. It is described by Cadw as having a "symmetrical original three-window front of two storeys and attic; white-painted brickwork with dentil course at eaves" and a "slate roof with generous verge overhangs". A local milestone became a Grade II listed building on 23 October 2003 at the time the Green Inn was listed.

To the north of the hamlet is Golfa Farm and Golfa Isaf, a two-storey Grade II listed 17th-century timber-framed house. It is noted for its large chimney on the eastern gable and "considerable timber framing". To the south of the Tanat to the southwest of Abercynllaith is Henblas, a hall which became a Grade II* listed building in October 1952 because it is, according to Cadw, "an important late mediaeval house with an interesting developmental history, particularly fine carpentry and a sub-mediaeval wing refaced in brickwork of exceptional quality".
