= Welsh Mountain sheep =

Breed of sheep

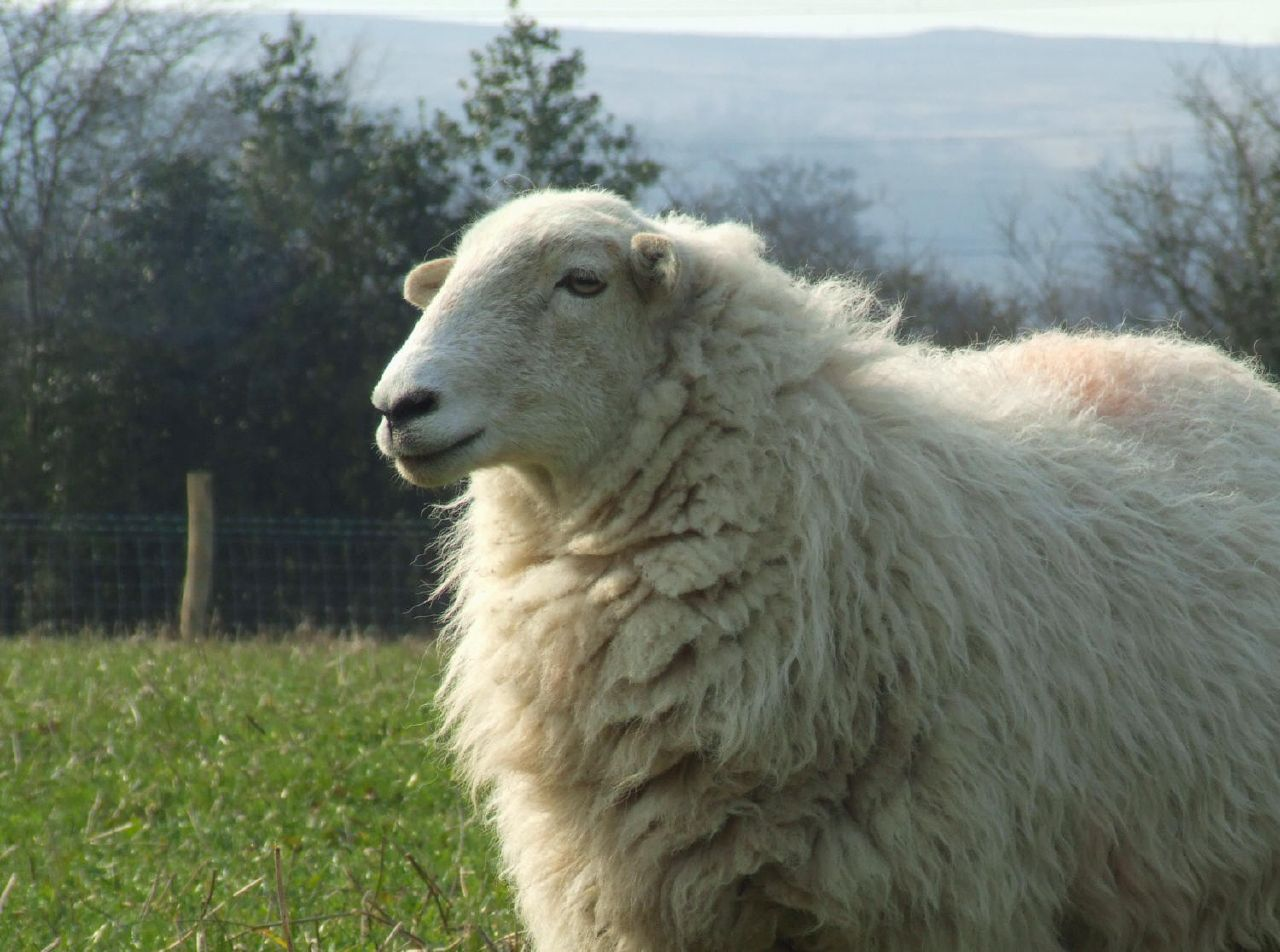
A white Welsh Mountain ewe

Welsh Mountain sheep (Welsh: Defaid Mynydd Cymreig, pronounced [ˈdɛvaid ˈmənɨð ˈkəmrɛiɡ]; singular Dafad) are small, hardy sheep from the higher parts of the Welsh mountains. The males have horns, and the females are polled (hornless); they have no wool on the face or legs, and they have long tails (normally left undocked). There are a number of varieties, bred for sheep farming in Wales. These are mainly colour variations, but some are being developed as separate breeds.

== Description ==
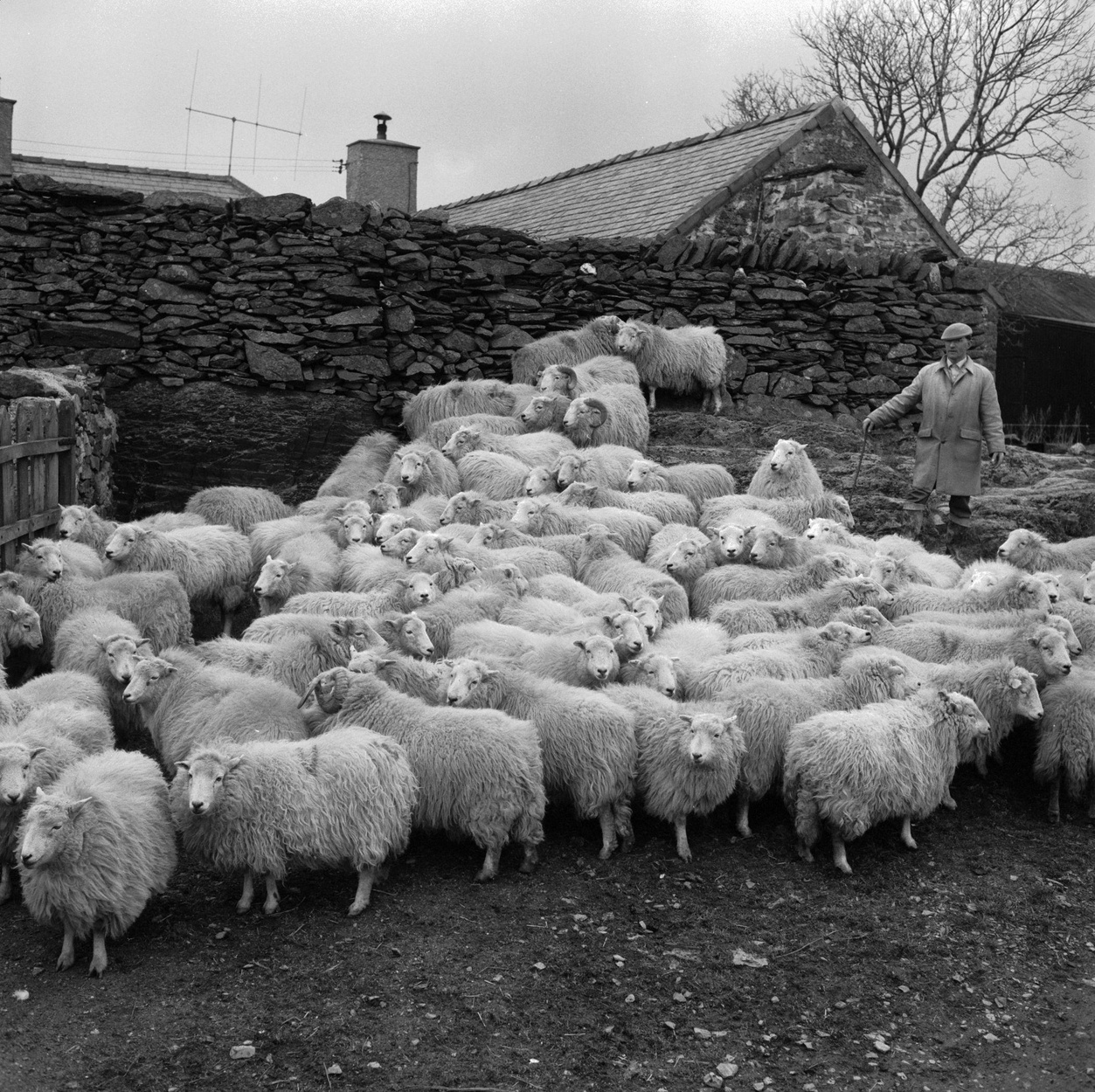
A flock of Welsh Mountain sheep

The Welsh Mountain sheep is usually white with a white face with no wool on forehead or cheeks and white legs with no wool below the joint. Females are polled but rams usually have curved horns, although some are polled. The fleece is thick and moderately long and the tails are not normally docked.

Breeders give a high priority to hardiness, milking ability, mothering quality and lamb survival. (Lambing percentage can be 130%, which rises to 180% under favourable conditions on improved pastures.) It was not always thus; the 18th-century English agriculturist Arthur Young described the Welsh Mountain sheep as "the most despicable of all types" and a judge at an agricultural show in the 1880s described it as "a diminutive ill-shapen animal with its shaggy coat more reminiscent of hair than of wool".

== Adaptations ==
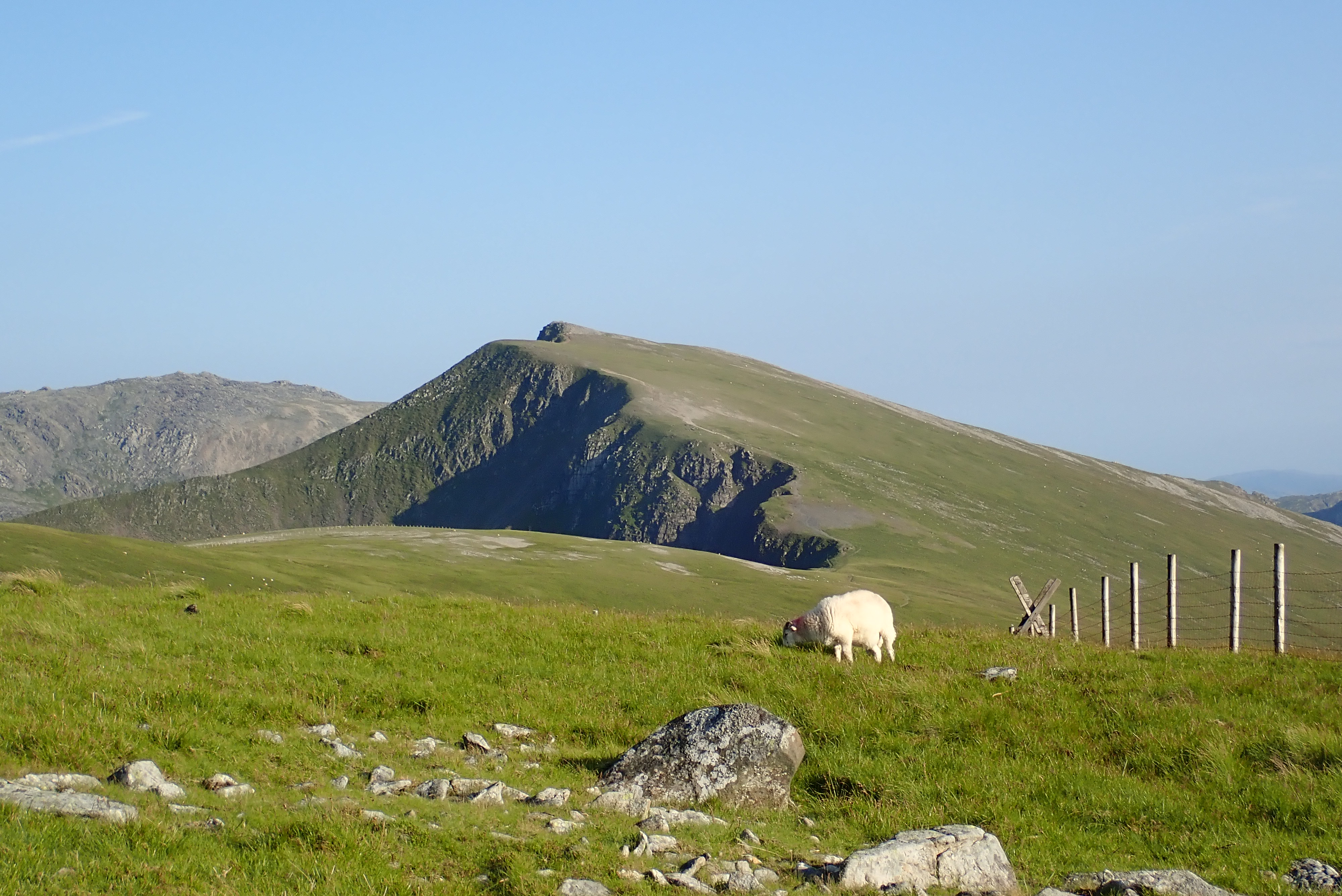
A Welsh Mountain sheep near Mynydd Perfedd and Y Garn

The Welsh Mountain sheep is well suited to the harsh environment in which it lives. It is small and sure-footed, able to pick its way over rock and scree, find shelter in stormy weather, dig through snow, climb walls and push through small gaps, make its way through bogs and find sufficient food in the most meagre pastures. In their native Wales they are kept on the hills or open mountain all year round, being rounded up a few times each year, and possibly being brought down to in-bye land at lambing time. Most flocks are descended from sheep that have grazed the same mountains for generations. There are stories of marauding sheep raiding dustbins in Blaenau Ffestiniog and of others rolling across cattle grids to access better pastures.

== Varieties ==
There are a number of varieties of Welsh Mountain sheep, named for their locality of origin or their appearance. The standard Welsh Mountain sheep is completely white. It is the most common variety in the mountains of Wales and has been exported to other parts of the world. The Badger Face Welsh Mountain (Defaid Idloes, [ˈdevaɪd ˈɪdlɔɪs]) comes in two varieties, the Torddu ([tɔrˈðiː], 'black-bellied'), which is white with a dark face and belly, and the Torwen ([tɔrˈwɛn], 'white-bellied'), which is black with a white belly and white stripes over the eyes. The Balwen Welsh Mountain is black (fading to brown in sunlight and greying with age) with a white blaze on the face, white socks on legs below hocks and a part-white tail. Black Welsh Mountain sheep (Defaid Mynydd Duon, [ˈdevaɪd ˈmənɪð ˈdɪɔn]) are entirely black. Many flocks of white Welsh Mountains contain one or two black sheep, but these sheep are now also bred as a consistent black variety. The South Wales Mountain is similar to other Welsh Mountains, but is rather larger. It is white, with tan markings on legs and face, and a brown collar.

== Uses ==
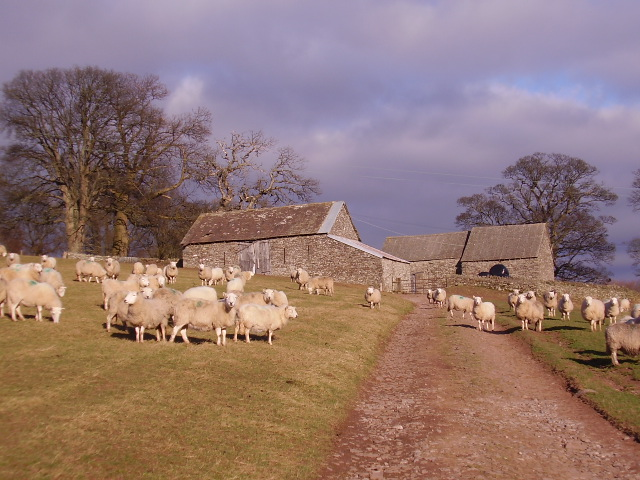
A flock of Welsh Mountain sheep

The Welsh Mountain sheep is a dual-purpose breed and is the foundation of the Welsh sheep industry. In the Middle Ages these sheep were predominantly kept for their wool and milk, but by the nineteenth century they had become renowned in England for the taste of their meat and Queen Victoria is reported to have demanded Welsh lamb at the royal table.

The fleece of the Welsh Mountain sheep varies considerably across the range of varieties. That of the large South Wales Mountain sheep contains a high proportion of kemp, whereas the fleece of the Black Welsh Mountain sheep is fine and soft, contains very little kemp and is attractive to hand-spinners. A typical fleece of this black variety weighs around 3 to 4 lb (1.4 to 1.8 kg) with a staple length of 2 to 4 in (5 to 10 cm).

The meat of the Welsh Mountain lamb is much esteemed, and carcasses have often won prizes at shows like the Royal Smithfield in London. The carcass of a pure-bred Welsh Mountain lamb is usually within the range 25 to 35 lb (11 to 16 kg) whereas a lamb from a cross between a Welsh ewe and a down breed ram, or a lamb raised on improved land, is larger at around 35 to 45 lb (16 to 20 kg).
