= Tir Gofal =

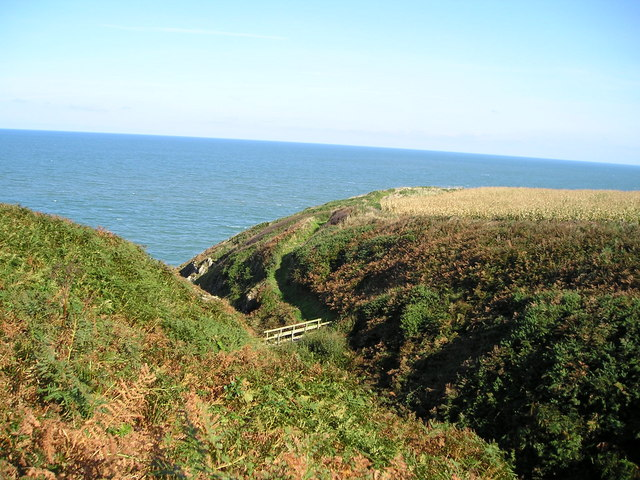
Permissive access path, part of a Tir Gofal scheme

Tir Gofal (Welsh Care of the Land) was an agri-environmental scheme in Wales launched by the Countryside Council for Wales in 1999. It aimed to encourage farmers and landowners to manage their land in an environmentally friendly way. Its main objectives were "to protect and enhance habitats of importance to wildlife, to protect the historic environment, to protect and restore rural landscapes and to promote public access to the countryside." The scheme operated under the Common Agricultural Policy, and was jointly funded by the European Union and the United Kingdom Government. In 2011, the scheme was transferred into the management of the Welsh Government and subsequently replaced by another environmental scheme, Glastir.

== The scheme ==
Tir Gofal was a whole-farm scheme available to any person with control over at least 3 hectares (7.4 acres) of agricultural land in Wales. The participant had to agree to manage the land according to a management plan drawn up at the start of the agreement. Elements of the scheme included: the voluntary creation of permissive access to the site; capital payments to protect and manage habitats, create features and support new access provision; and optional training courses in such skills as hedge-laying, dry stone wall building, care of woodlands and management of wetland habitats. The management plan was for an initial five year commitment and could be renewed for an additional five-year period. Under the scheme, the cost of capital works included in the plan was reimbursed and an annual payment was made to the participant.

== The results ==
The scheme was audited and a report published in September 2008. The scheme had at that time paid out more than £100 million to landholders since it began in 1999, and management agreements had been made with around 3,000 farms, covering about 20 per cent of the total agricultural land in Wales. The report concluded that the scheme was contributing towards its objectives, but that its impact was difficult to assess because of lack of evidence of the extent to which its aims had been achieved. The basic design was thought to be sound but it failed to address specific needs and local conditions.
