= Economy of the Falkland Islands =

- Currency: Falkland pound
- Fixed exchange rates: 1 Falkland pound = 100 pence
- Fiscal year: 1 April–31 March

Statistics
- GDP: $206.4 million (2015 est.)
- GDP rank: 221st (PPP, 2015)
- GDP growth: 25.5% (2015 est.)
- GDP per capita: PPP: $77,692 (2013 est.)
- GDP by sector: agriculture: (41%), industry: (20.6%), services: (38.4%) (2015 est.)
- Inflation (CPI): 1.4% (CPI, 2014)
- Gini coefficient: 36 (2015)
- Labour force: 1,850 (2016 est.)
- Labour force by occupation: agriculture: 41%, industry: 24.5%, services: 34.5% (2015 est.)
- Unemployment: 1.0% (2020)
- Main industries: fish and wool processing; tourism

External
- Exports: $257.3 million (2015 est.)
- Export goods: Molluscs, fish, wool, sheep meat (2021)
- Main export partners: Spain 78%, United States 6% (2019)
- Imports: $90 million (2004 est.)
- Import goods: fuel, food and drink, building materials, clothing
- Main import partners: United Kingdom 79%, Netherlands 16% (2019)
- Gross external debt: $0 (2017 est.)

Public finance
- Government debt: 0% of GDP (2015 est.)
- Revenue: $67.1 million (FY2009 / 2010)
- Spending: $75.3 million (FY2009 / 2010)
- Economic aid: $0 (1997 est.)
- All values, unless otherwise stated, are in US dollars.

The economy of the Falkland Islands, which first involved sealing, whaling and provisioning ships, became heavily dependent on sheep farming from the 1870s to 1980. It then diversified and now has income from tourism, commercial fishing, and servicing the fishing industry as well as agriculture. The Falkland Islands use the Falkland pound, which is backed by the British pound.

== Historical development ==
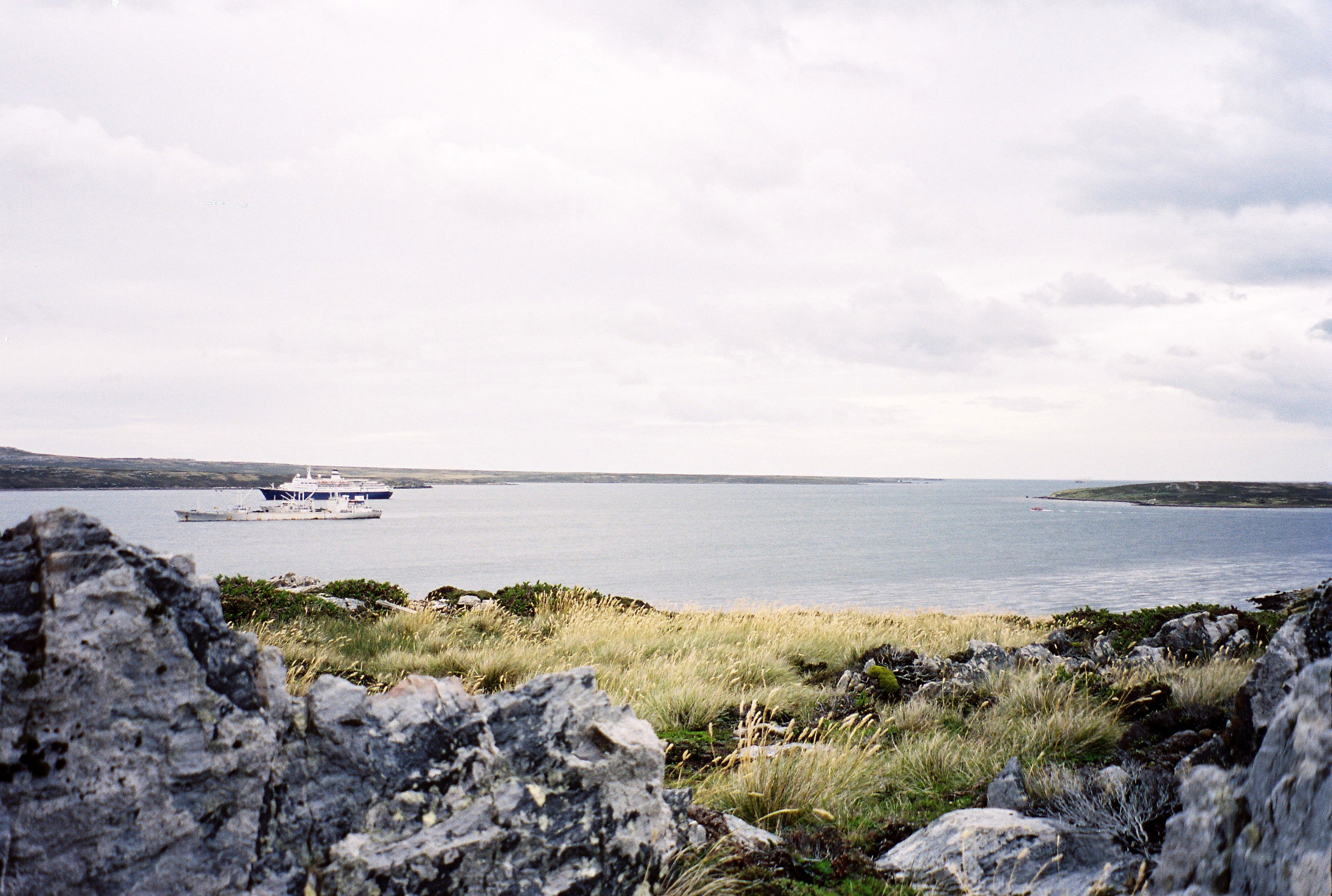
A squid trawler, and a cruise ship in Port William representing two trends in recent economic development

The Falkland Islands have historically been extremely isolated. During the 19th century, the supply and maintenance depot for ships at Stanley developed into a port serving ships rounding Cape Horn and for South Polar expeditions. There was also trade in cow hides from the wild descendants of cattle introduced by French settlers in the late 18th century. Sheep farming was then introduced, taking over from the cattle trade in the 1870s and becoming self-supporting by 1885. The islands also provided a base for whaling and sealing, with factories being built on East Falkland and South Georgia Island, but these industries ended.

By the Falklands War of 1982 sheep farming was the islands' only industry and their economic viability was in doubt, but after the war there was a new commitment from the Government of the United Kingdom. The Falkland Islands Development Corporation was formed in mid 1984 and in its annual report at the end of that year it set out to increase employment opportunities by encouraging diversification, to increase population levels through selective immigration, to aim for long-term self-sufficiency and to improve community facilities. To achieve this, the Corporation identified agricultural improvements, tourism, self-sufficiency in energy, development of the industrial and service sector, fisheries, and land subdivision as areas to tackle.

The largest company in the islands used to be the Falkland Islands Company (FIC), a publicly quoted company on the London Stock Exchange. The company was responsible for the majority of the economic activity on the islands, though its farms were sold in 1991 to the Falkland Islands Government. The company now operates several retail outlets in Stanley and is involved in port services and shipping operations.

By 2002 the Falklands' economy was booming, with income from tourism and the sale of squid fishing licences as well as from indigenous fishing companies with locally registered boats. Fishing boats visit the islands from Spain, Korea, Taiwan and Japan, and obtain supplies and services from the islands. An islander told the BBC that "we were the luckiest people that was ever mixed up in a war", and British diplomats joked that the Falklands should have a monument to Leopoldo Galtieri, the Argentinean dictator who invaded the islands. In 2007, Argentina withdrew from a 1995 agreement that set terms for exploitation of offshore resources. It is thought that there might be up to 60 billion barrels (9.5 km^{3}) of oil under the sea bed surrounding the islands. Desire Petroleum and Rockhopper Exploration began drilling for oil in the vicinity of the Falklands in the first half of 2010, sparking strong protest from the Argentine government. Diplomatic disputes with Argentina disrupted tourism slightly in 2004. Buenos Aires refused permission for charter flights from Chile that served cruise ships to fly over Argentina to reach the islands.

== Economic overview ==
Exports of Falkland Islands by product category (2019) Chemical products Transportation Machines Mineral products Plastics and rubbers Metals Foodstuffs Precious metals Textiles Instruments Animal products Vegetable products Paper goods Footwear and headwear Miscellaneous Stone and glass Wood products Animal and vegetable bi-products Animal hides Arts and antiques Weapons

The Falkland Islands have a GDP of $164.5 million, and a per capita GDP of $70,800 (2015 estimate) compared with the United Kingdom GDP per capita of $35,200 (2009 estimate). The contributors to the GDP by sector (2010 forecast) are:

- Fisheries – 52.5%
- Government (including health and education) – 14.0%
- Communications, Finance and Business services – 11.4%
- Hospitality & Transport – 7.7%
- Construction – 6.6%
- Housing and other services – 3.2%
- Mining. Quarrying & Manufacturing – 2.1%
- Agriculture – 1.6%
- Utilities – 0.9%

In the 2009/10 financial year, the government revenue was £42.4 million of which £14.5 million came from fishery licences and services and £10.5 million from taxes. During the same period the government expenditure was £47.6 million.

Other economic indicators include:

Electricity – production: 19 million kWh (2016 est.)

Electricity – production by source: (2016 est.)

- Fossil fuels: 74%
- Non-hydro renewables: 26%

Electricity – consumption: 17.67 million kWh (2016 est.)

Installed nameplate capacity of electric generation

12,100 kW (2016 est.)

== Banking ==
The Falkland Islands do not have a central bank but the Standard Chartered Bank has a single branch in Stanley that offers retail, commercial and wholesale banking facilities.

The constitution requires the governor of the islands to seek the approval of a British Secretary of State before assenting to any bill that affects "the currency of the Falkland Islands or relating to the issue of banknotes" or any bill that establishes "any banking association or altering the constitution, rights or duties of any such association". These restrictions effectively give the British Government the ability to prevent the island's government from declaring the islands to be a tax haven or from establishing a central bank.

== Agriculture ==
Farmland accounts for a little over 80% of the Falklands land area and a sheep appears on the islands' coat of arms, but agriculture is now less than 2% of the economy. As of 2007, 670,000 sheep resided on the islands; a 2011 report estimated the sheep population at over one million. Roughly 40% of the national flock are on West Falkland and 60% on East Falkland. The base flock are Corriedale and Polwarth breeds with Dohne Merino, South African Meat Merinos, Afrinos and other breeds having been introduced to improve the fineness of wool and meat characteristics. The wool price suffered a slump in 2005/6 and a peak in 2008. Since 2003 the relative premium commanded by higher quality wool has increased with coarser wool missing out on the high prices in 2008. A summary of the prices for the period 2002 to 2010, which are often dictated by Australian exchange rate and weather conditions is shown below:

Fibre diameter	Minimum price (p/kg)	Maximum price (p/kg)
32 microns	130 (2007)	210 (2003)
28 microns	180 (2006)	280 (2003)
24 microns	255 (2006)	530 (2010)
20 microns	290 (2005)	590 (2010)

Although the production of wool is spread across the islands, the breeding of animals for slaughter is concentrated on East Falkland where the EU accredited Send Bay abattoir is situated. An additional cost borne by producers on West Falklands is the fare charged for crossing the Falklands Sound. As of 2010, the ferry company making the crossing charged commercial vehicles £30 per metre for a single trip plus £2 per head of sheep. Wool on the other hand is charged "£45 per tonne delivered to Stanley".

An increasing number of farmers are supplying lamb to the Falkland Islands Meat Company. The abattoir received export accreditation in December 2002 and began exporting meat in May 2003. The number of farms supplying lambs increased from 6 in 2003 to 27 in 2007 while the number of lambs sent to the abattoir rose from 2600 to 11,963 in the same period.

Selected statistics for the year 2008-09 relating to sheep farming are given below:

Region	Area used for sheep (hectares)	Number of sheep	Sheep slaughtered	Wool clipped (kg)	Average fleece (kg)	Greasy wool yield (kg/hectare)
East Falkland	612,935	292,917	22,023	923,632	3.69	1.86
West Falkland	425,592	182,741	7,839	602,618	3.60	1.54
Islands	85,458	28,962	4,197	110,595	4.55	1.69
Total	1,123,985	504,620	34,059	1,636,845	3.95	1.70

There are also a small number of cows, pigs and horses on the islands that are reared for local use.

== Fishing ==
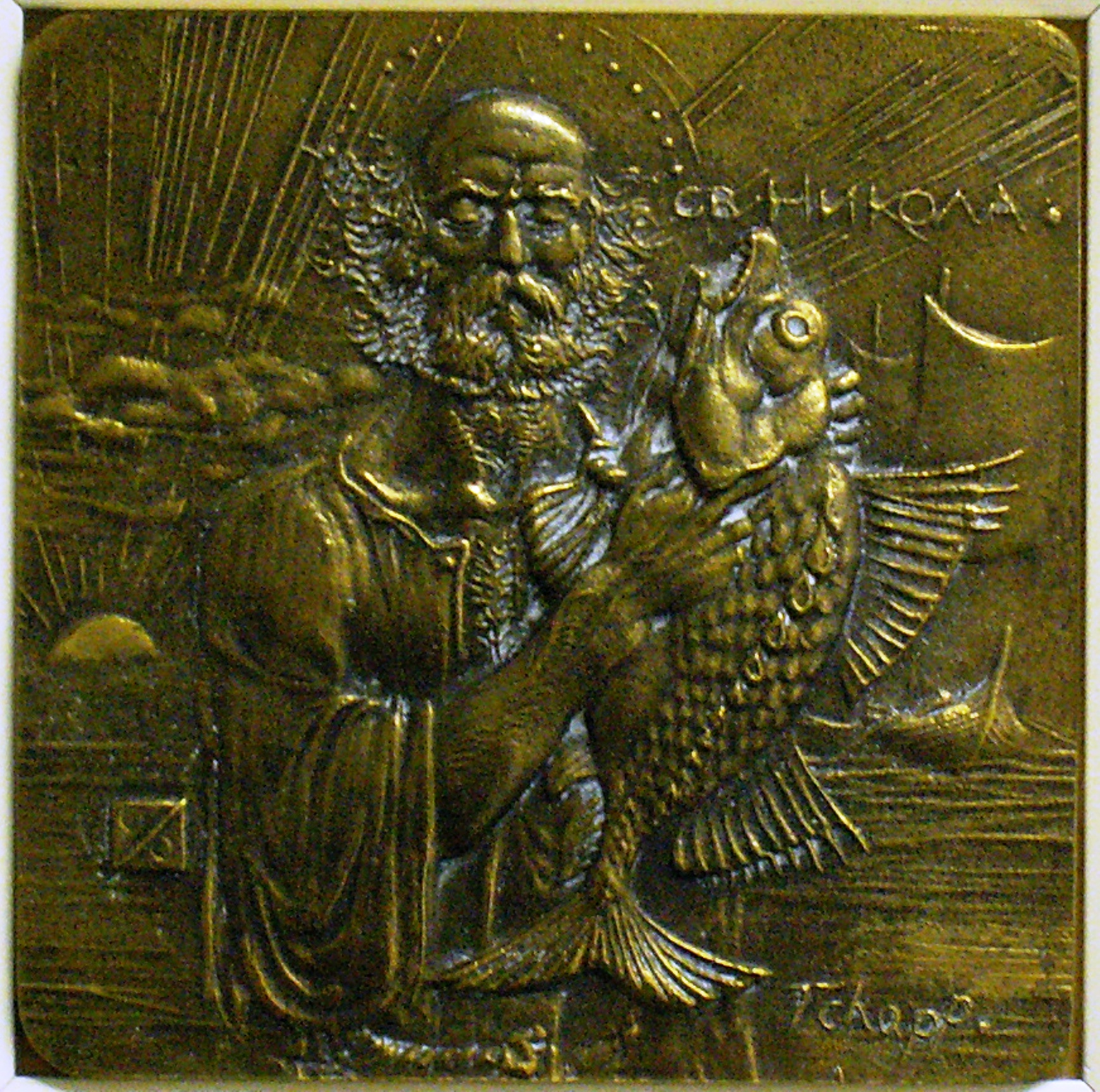
Metal icon depicting St Nicholas, the patron saint of fishermen. The icon is located at the premises of the Falklands Legislative Assembly at Gilbert House in Stanley, Falkland Islands

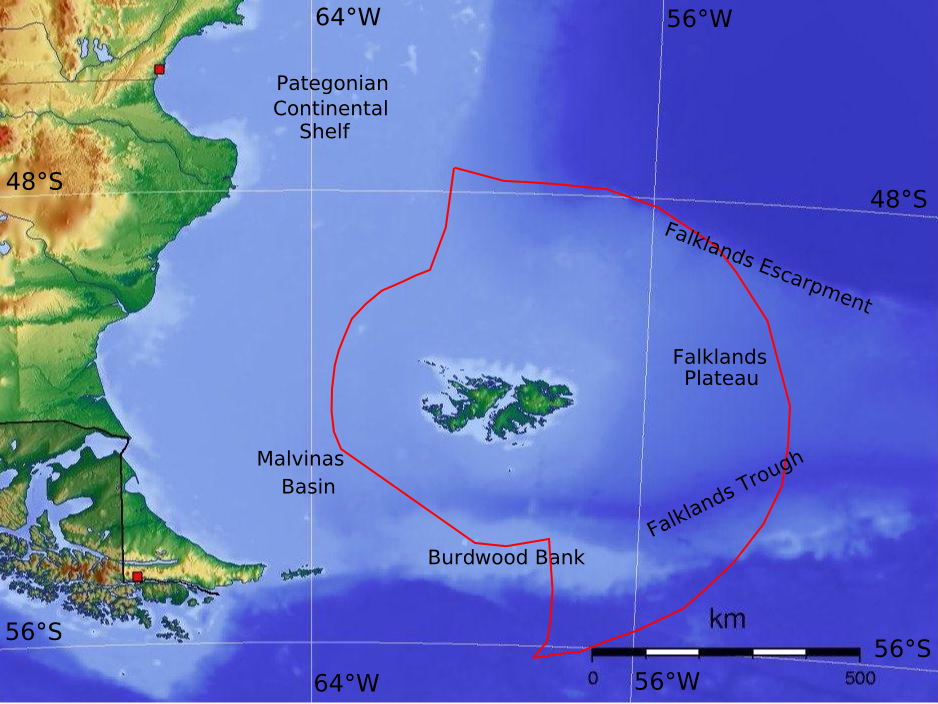
Map of the Falkland Islands economic zone in relation to her neighbours

Fishing is the largest part of the economy. Although Lord Shackleton's Report (1982) recommended the setting up of a 200-nautical-mile (370 km; 230 mi) fisheries limit which gave an impetus to the fishing industry, the report did not go into much detail regarding the expansion of the industry. The Falkland Islands Development Corporation which formed as a result of the Shackleton Report provided the impetus for the Falkland Islands to exploit their marine environment.

=== Fishing grounds ===
The Falkland Islands' fishing waters form part of the 2.7 million square kilometre Patagonian Shelf large marine ecosystem and are located on a spur from the Patagonian Continental Shelf. Most of the fishing takes place in water up to 200 metres (660 ft) deep on this spur or on the Burdwood Bank - another spur lying on an undersea ridge to the south of the Falkland Islands and separated from the islands by a deep channel known as the Falklands Trough. At its highest point, the Burdwood Bank is 46 metres (151 ft) below sea level.

The principal ocean currents in the Falkland Island waters are the West Wind Drift, a cold current from the Southern Pacific Ocean that flows westwards to the south of the Burdwood Bank and the north flowing cold Falklands current, an offshoot of the West Wind Drift that curls around the east of Falklands Plateau and along the Falklands and Patagonian escarpments. It joins the saltier warm Brazil Current in the vicinity of the mouth of the Río de la Plata to form the South Atlantic Current.

In 1986 the Falklands opened up their fishing industry to outsiders with the declaration of a 160-nautical-mile (300 km; 180 mi) radius Fisheries Conservation & Management Zone centered on the Falkland Sound. This zone was later to become the Falklands Inner Conservation Zone (FICZ). Apart from the Falkland Trough, this zone lies within the continental shelf. In 1990 the Falklands Outer Conservation Zone (FOCZ) was declared – a zone that lay between the perimeter of the FICZ and the Falklands 200-nautical-mile economic zone boundary. The FOCZ includes part of the Burdwood Bank, borders on the confines of the continental shelf and includes part of the Falklands Escarpment - a 2,000-metre (6,600 ft) undersea escarpment running east–west.

At the same time that the FOCZ was declared, the Argentine declared its 200-nautical-mile Exclusive Economic Zone (EEZ) and together with the British Government (acting on behalf of the Falkland Islands) set up the South Atlantic Fisheries Commission (SAFC) to coordinate the management of fishing stocks in the area.

=== Fish stocks ===
Tonne / ton conversion
1 tonne	= 1000 kg
1 tonne	= 0.984 long tons
1 tonne	= 1.102 short tons
1 tonne	= 2204 lbs

Most of the fish that are harvested in the Falkland Islands waters are either squid or finfish. Other types of fish form an insignificant part of the Falkland Islands' catch. A significant number of the fish that are taken are migratory with the spawning grounds and feeding grounds of some species being highly dependent on the water temperature.

==== Squid ====
The Illex squid (Illex argentinus) which typically has a mantle length of 20 to 28 centimetres (8 to 11 in) and a weight of 150 to 500 grams (5 to 18 oz) is the most important fish to the Falklands economy followed by its smaller cousin, the Patagonian squid (Doryteuthis gahi) which typically has a mantle length of 10 to 15 centimetres (4 to 6 in) and a weight of 75 to 150 grams (3 to 5 oz). Neither species was discovered in substantial numbers near the Falklands until the late 1980s.

The illex squid has its spawning grounds at the mouth of the Río de la Plata and a migratory pattern that takes it southwards along the Patagonian Shelf as far as the FICZ to its feeding grounds. It then returns to its spawning grounds via a route that lies off the continental shelf. In some years, such as 2007, it enters the FICZ with a resultant good harvest, it other years, such as 2009, it does not migrate as far south as the FICZ at all. The catch for the 2010 season in the Falklands recovered to 12105 tonnes, but still the fourth lowest since the beginning of the licensing system. This has been attributed to the lower than usual sea temperatures during the feeding season in February–May.

The Patagonian squid, unlike the Illex, remain in Falkland Island waters all year and are concentrated in the Loloigo box—an area within the Falklands Plateau to the east and south-east of the islands and are harvested during both the austral spring and autumn.

==== Finfish ====
In the 1970s many fin fish, particularly the rock cod, a high volume low value fish were exploited to near-extinction. The levels of rock cod taken in the whole of the South Atlantic dropped by 99.3% in the space of two years between the 1969–70 and 1971–72 seasons. while the patagonian rockcod was fished to near-extinction in the Shag Rock area. This resulted in a ban on fishing which was lifted in 2005. Following the collapse of the Illex industry in 2008/9, the rock cod has become, by weight, the most heavily harvested species in the area.

In 2006, a Spanish vessel on an exploratory trawl found commercial quantities of grenadiers (Macrourus spp., Coelorhynchus spp.) to the south and east of the Falkland Islands at depths between 750 and 830 metres (2,460 and 2,720 ft) depths in the eastern part of FICZ. It has been estimated that this species needs a stock biomass of 40000 tonnes to produce a sustainable harvest of 3000 tonnes per annum and is now reflected as a separate entry in the tables below.

=== License quota policy and revenue ===
With the establishment of the FICZ, the Falklands Fisheries Department issued licences that enable foreign vessels to fish in Falklands waters. Initially there were seven classes of licence, but as of the 2009 season, this was increased to ten classes of licence. Each class of licence has its own characteristics – species or combination of species that may be taken, net sizes that may be used and seasons when the licence is valid. The main fishing areas are in waters that are up to 200 metres (660 ft) deep with principal concentrations close to the confluence of the FOCZ, FICZ and EEZ to the north west of the Islands and also on the Burwood Bank – a shallow water to the south of the Islands. Initially licences were issued on a total allowable effort (TAE) but in 2007, the toothfish longline fishery became the first fishery in the Falkland Islands to be issued on a total allowable catch (TAC) basis. Apart from the Islander's own fleet, the principal fishing fleets come from Spain, Korea and Taiwan. When the Falkland Islands first opened up her waters, the Polish fishing fleet had a presence as did the Japanese, but the Poles stopped fishing in the area in the mid-1990s and the Japanese in the middle of the first decade of the twenty-first century. By 2002 the license revenue was so great that the island government had no debt and had built up more than £80 million in savings.

Since 1993, the principal licence classes have been:

- A licence – Permits the taking of unrestricted fin fish during the first season
- B licence – Permits the taking of Illex squid.
- X licence – Permits the taking of Patagonian squid during the second season (Loligo).
- Y licence – Permits the taking of unrestricted fin fish during the second season (The Southern blue whitting and the Hoki in particular are classed as restricted fish).

Revenue from licence fees (£ millions)

Licence type	1989–1993 (Average)	1994–1998 (Average)	1999–2003 (Average)	2004–2008 (Average)	2009	Average 1989–2009
B	19.91	12.45	13.60	4.09	0.00	11.92
X	3.77	3.58	3.67	1.70	1.94	3.12
Y	0.80	2.08	1.80	3.07	4.24	2.05
Others	1.70	3.67	4.87	4.65	4.67	3.76
Total	26.18	21.78	23.93	13.51	10.85	20.85

=== International cooperation ===
The Antarctic Treaty was signed by both the United Kingdom and Argentina in 1959. In its wake, the Convention for the Conservation of Antarctic Marine Living Resources (CCAMLR), a treaty signed by 24 nations and covering the area that includes most of the Falkland Islands waters, came into force in 1982, having been signed by the United Kingdom on 31 August 1981 and Argentina on 28 May 1982. The convention covers Southern Ocean ecosystem which is generally accepted as being south of approximately 50° to 55°S. The CCAMLR provides a forum for exchanging information regarding marine life in the Antarctic region and has the authority to ban the harvesting of certain type of fish and also to ban or put restrictions on the use of certain methods of harvesting. The convention requires that member states who are not parties to the Antarctic Treaty accept certain provisions of that treaty.

The South Atlantic Fisheries Commission (SAFC) was set up in 1990 between the Argentine and the United Kingdom (acting on behalf of the Falkland Islands) to exchange information and to coordinate fishing activities in the South Atlantic. One of their prime activities was the monitoring of the Illex spawning stock biomass (SSB). If the SSB drops below a threshold of 40000 tonnes the SAFC recommend will early closure of the fishing season. Since 2005 the SAFC has been largely moribund as the Argentine Government reduced co-operation, declining to continue the routine joint meeting process and suspending joint scientific activities. She has since extended her claim to all of the Falkland Island waters.

=== Catch statistics ===
The table below shows the average catch in tonnes of various species (as categorised by FIFD - Falkland Island Fisheries Department) for successive five-year periods.

Common name	Scientific name	Type	Season	1989–1993 (Average)	1994–1998 (Average)	1999–2003 (Average)	2004–2008 (Average)	2009
Red cod	Salilota australis	Fin	Feb–Nov	4350	6564	4932	3598	5079
Southern blue whiting	Micromesistius australis	Fin	Sep–Mar	45053	31834	24675	20309	10395
Argentine shortfin squid	Illex argentinus	Squid	Mar–Jun	161277	89120	144665	72656	44
Kingklip	Genypterus blacodes	Fin	Feb–Nov	1274	1635	1720	2483	3395
Patagonian squid	Loligo gahi	Squid	Feb–Apr; Jul–Sep	78238	60646	44811	44595	31475
Sevenstar flying squid	Martialia hyadesii	Squid		36	2003	52	5	0
Argentine hake Southern hake (or austral hake)	Merluccius hubbsi Merluccius australis	Fin	Mar–Oct	8448	2003	2583	7763; 690	13051; 0
Skates and rays	Rajidae	Skate & ray	Apr–Dec	5361	3769	4060	5009	5865
Patagonian toothfish	Dissostichus eleginoides	Fin	All year	546	1806	2112	1640	1419
Patagonian grenadier	Macruronus magellanicus	Fin	Feb–Nov	9612	14973	21770	18992	23170
Grenadier	Macrouridae	Fin					787	958
Patagonian rockcod	Patagonotothen brevicauda brevicauda	Fin					46986	58149
Scallop	Zygochlamys patagonica	Mollusc				273	764	13
Other			All year	2285	1662	2749	3706	246
Total				316479	215632	254284	203182	153258

== Tourism ==
Tourism is the second-largest part of the economy. In 1982, an average of only 500 tourists visited the Falklands per annum but by 2007, this figure had grown to 55,000 and the Falkland Islands Tourist Board hired its first tourism director that year. In 2010, the transport and hospitality sector was expected to contribute £7.8 million or 7.7% of the island's GDP. Tourism forms a significant part of this figure with land-based visitors expected to contribute £2.7 million to the Islands' economy in 2010. The islands have become a regular port of call for the growing market of cruise ships to Antarctica and elsewhere in the South Atlantic. Attractions include the scenery and wildlife conservation including 1,000,000 penguins, seabirds, seals, and sea lions, as well as visits to battlefields, golf, fishing and wreck diving. In addition to accommodation in Stanley, there are tourist lodges at Port Howard, Darwin, Pebble Island, Carcass Island, and Sea Lion Island. Self-catering accommodation at holiday cottages on island farms. The total contribution of tourism to the Islands' is expected to reach £5.4 million in 2010.

During the 2008–2009 season almost 69,000 tourists visited the Falklands, with 62,600 of these arriving onboard cruise or expedition vessels. Since cruise liners have their own accommodation, substantial numbers of tourists can be accommodated at once, such as an occasion in 2005 when 3000 tourists visited the islands in one day. In 2013 passengers from cruise ships faced protests in Latin American ports over the British military presence. The cruise industry is expecting passenger numbers to decline from 39,500 in 2013–2014 to 34,000 for 2014–2015. However land tourism is increasing which is offsetting the effect of a decrease in cruise tourism.

Other sources of "tourist" revenue include spending by the British military personnel based on the islands, by business travellers and by pilgrims to the graves of both British and Argentine soldiers who fell in the 1982 Falklands War. Although there is still a resentment in the Islands to the Argentine occupation, the Falkland Islands Government continues "to respect the need for Argentine veterans of the 1982 conflict and their next of kin to visit the battlefield sites and the cemetery at Darwin". Such visits are arranged in conjunction with LAN Airlines (Chile) who, on such occasions, use larger aircraft than normal for the weekly flights.

== Energy and minerals ==
=== Petroleum exploration ===
Four sedimentary basins that could potentially contain hydrocarbons have been identified in the Falkland Island waters. They are:

- North Falkland Basin which is located to the north of the islands.
- Falklands Plateau Basin which is located to the east of the East Falkland.
- South Falklands Basin which lies to the south-east of the islands and extends up to the Falklands Trough.
- Malvinas Basin which lies to the south-west of West Falkland, between that island and Tierra del Fuego at the head of the Falklands Trough. Part of this basin lies in Argentine waters.

The latter three basins are part of a larger contiguous formation.

In May 2015 oil was discovered in Isobel deep by a consortium of oil companies including Falkland Oil & Gas, Premier Oil, and Rockhopper Oil & Gas. In 2023, Rockhopper (working with Tel Aviv-listed Navitas Petroleum) indicated that it had been presented with a new development plan for its Sea Lion project that aimed to cut costs and proceed in phases. It was stated that: "If realized, the new plan—with a total price tag of $2.2 billion—could lead to 80,000 barrels per day of production (up to 100,000 b/d at peak) via a leased floating production, storage and offloading unit". A final investment decision was targeted for early 2024, though it experienced delays.

A public consultation on the project took place in the summer of 2024 and was reported to have garnered widespread support from Falkland Islanders. Since Britain's newly elected Labour Government banned similar oil projects in the United Kingdom, this created the prospect for a potential conflict between the Falkland Islands' government and the British government. Nevertheless, the authority to approve oil development around the islands was said to rest solely with the Falkland Islands' government. In November 2024, the Falklands' government Executive Council indicated that, while the public consultation process had been successfully concluded, "some matters" related to the Environmental Impact Statement required "further discussion" and that any development and production program would need to be considered separately by the Executive Council.

Navitas Petroleum subsequently indicated that a final investment decision was delayed to mid-2025 with first oil not anticipated until late 2027, at the earliest. Although certified gross 2C recoverable oil resources had increased from 791 million bbls to 917 million bbls, phase 1 costs had increased to $1.4 billion. It was subsequently indicated that the final investment decision had been further pushed back into late 2025.

In December 2025, it was indicated that, after prolonged consideration, Rockhopper Exploration and Navitas Petroleum had taken the final investment decisions for the development of Phase 1 of the field and sanctioned the project. Phase 1, aims to produce 170 mmbbls at a peak production of approximately 50,000 bbls/d. The first oil from Phase 1 was planned for 2028. Argentina immediately rejected these plans with the Argentine foreign ministry stating that Argentina would: “deepen its action plan to adopt all additional measures, in accordance with international law, that it deems necessary to safeguard its sovereign rights and interests.”

=== Renewable energy sources ===
The islands have been investing in windpower – in 2010, three 330 kW wind turbines were installed at Sand Bay, about 10 kilometres (6 mi) from Stanley on the opposite side of the valley from three turbines that were installed in 2007. The island's government has plans to install a 2 MWh battery storage system which will allow surplus wind energy to be stored. The first three turbines resulted in a 20% reduction in the Stanley power station's fuel consumption and it was hoped that the second set of three turbines would double this figure. In parallel, there are on-going investigations into other forms of renewable energy for remote locations on the islands.

== Transport in the Falkland Islands ==
The Falkland Islands currently has three primary means of transport – road, sea and air. There is now an international airport, a domestic airport, a number of airstrips, a growing road network and a much-improved ferry service between the two main islands.

== Philately and numismatics ==
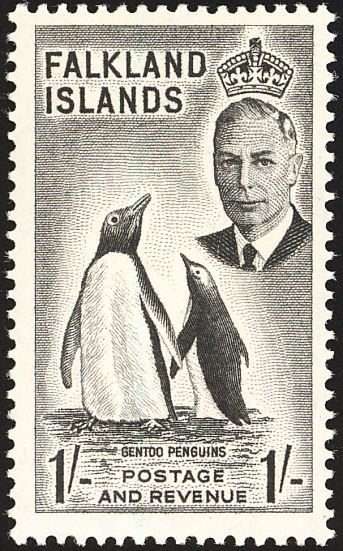
1952 Falkland Islands stamp with Gentoo Penguins

In October 1877, the Secretary of State of the Colonial Office, the Earl of Carnarvon began the process of application for the Falkland Islands to join the General Postal Union (renamed Universal Postal Union in 1879). The first stamps, 1d, 6d, and 1 shilling values featuring the usual profile of Queen Victoria, were issued 19 June 1878. Since then the islands have issued their own stamps, which are a source of revenue from overseas collectors. Between 2000 and 2008, the islands issued between six and eight sets of commemorative stamps. The workload placed on the Falkland Islands Post Office by overseas collectors led to the establishments in 1978 of the Falkland Islands Philatelic Bureau. The Bureau also handles philately-related sales on behalf of the governments of Government of South Georgia and the South Sandwich Islands and of the British Antarctic Territory.

Coins and banknotes may only be issued by the Falkland Islands Government with the authorisation of the British Government. Coins for local use were first struck in 1974 and are the same size as the corresponding British coins. There is a flourishing business in the issue of commemorative coins struck on behalf of the Falkland Island Government for collectors – in particular the 2007 series of coins that commemorated the 25th anniversary of the liberation of islands attracted much attention. The Falkland Islands Government (FIG) is required to deposit 110% of the face value of any coins struck on its behalf into its currency fund, thereby effectively backing the Falkland pound with the pound sterling. In the case of commemorative coins that are unlikely to be redeemed, this money represents a long-term investment. In many cases the set-up and production costs are carried by the mint concerned, who pay the FIG a royalty on coins that it sells to collectors.

== See also ==
- Falkland Islands Company
