= Falkland Islands oil =

South American oil fields

The Falkland Islands contain significant oil reserves, with the main basin being the Sea Lion Field.

== History ==
=== 1970s–1990s: Initial exploration ===
Geological surveys of the Falklands began in the late 1970s, when two petroleum services companies undertook seismic surveys of the Falklands and the surrounding seafloor. Although the data appeared to indicate the area was a viable site for exploratory drilling, the islands' government was not prepared to grant licences for drilling. With the growth of oil extraction in the North Sea, most crude extraction in British waters was confined to the North Sea area. Some limited surveying did continue, but this was halted entirely following the invasion of the Falkland Islands by Argentina in 1982 and the subsequent conflict.

In 1992 the Falkland Islands government contracted the British Geological Survey to resume geological survey work in the Falklands. After an initial investigation showed the presence of several Mesozoic basins in the waters surrounding the islands, the first round of exploratory licences was granted covering the most promising of these basins, a fractured basin of elongated shape in relatively shallow waters north of the islands. Other candidate basins, located to the south and east of the islands, present a greater technological challenge, as they are located in considerably deeper waters.

=== 1990s–2010s: Exploratory drilling ===
When the Falkland Islands government granted licenses in 1996, seven companies agreed upon an exploratory drilling campaign. Six exploratory wells were drilled as planned for the first five-year period of the licences.

Along with geological and geophysical data obtained during the exploration campaign, environmental data were also gathered. On the other hand, new investigations in this local were carried out during the drilling campaign and were the object of study in recent years. Investigations of oil reserves in the Falklands area continued, but no large-scale extraction has yet commenced.

A new programme of exploratory drilling was scheduled to begin in February 2010 when the Ocean Guardian begins an expected programme of ten exploration wells for Desire Petroleum plc and its associate companies.

== Basins ==
Four sedimentary basins that could potentially contain hydrocarbons have been identified in the Falkland Island waters. They are:

- North Falkland Basin which is located to the north of the islands and contains the Sea Lion Field.
- Falklands Plateau Basin which is located to the east of the East Falkland.
- South Falklands Basin which lies to the south-east of the islands and extends up to the Falklands Trough.
- Malvinas Basin which lies to the south-west of West Falkland, between that island and Tierra del Fuego at the head of the Falklands Trough. Part of this basin lies in Argentine waters.

The latter three basins are part of a larger contiguous formation.

An agreement signed in 1995 with Argentina had set the terms for exploitation of offshore resources including large oil reserves as it was thought that there might be up to 60 billion barrels (9.5 km^{3}) of oil under the sea bed surrounding the islands. However, in 2007 Argentina unilaterally withdrew from the agreement. In response, Falkland Oil & Gas has signed an agreement with BHP Billiton to investigate the potential exploitation of oil reserves. Climatic conditions of the southern seas mean that exploitation will be a difficult task, though economically viable, and the continuing Falkland Islands sovereignty dispute with Argentina is hampering progress.

Some 2012 exploration results have indicated that taxation on oil revenues, even though they will be amongst the lowest in the world, are expected to more than double the country's revenue.

As of 2011 the East and South Falklands Fields had not been fully evaluated. In 2012, Leiv Eirikson, a 5th generation semi-submersible drilling rig, had been expected to drill two exploratory wells for Falkland oil and gas in 2012. drilled in the East Falklands Basin.
