= Navitas =

Navitas may refer to:

- Navitas Limited, an Australian education services provider
- Navitas Park, a building in Aarhus, Denmark
- Navitas Land and Mineral Corporation, an American oil and gas exploration, development and production firm
- Navitas Petroleum, an Israeli oil & natural gas exploration company
