= Sea Lion Field =

Proposed oil field in the South Atlantic

- Oil field location off the coast of South America
- Country: Falkland Islands
- Region: South Atlantic
- Location: 220 kilometres (140 mi) north of East Falkland
- Block: 14/10
- Offshore/onshore: Offshore
- Coordinates: 49°15′56″S 59°015′18″W
- Operator: Rockhopper Exploration

Field history
- Discovery: 2010
- Start of production: Projected from 2028

Production
- Peak of production (oil): 50,000 barrels per day (~2.5×10^{6} t/a)

Sea Lion Field is an oil field in the South Atlantic Ocean, approximately 220 kilometres (140 mi) north of the Falkland Islands, within the North Falkland Basin. The field is estimated to contain gross recoverable resources of 917 million barrels of oil, making it the largest deepwater oil development in the South Atlantic outside Brazil, and larger than any North Sea oil projects.

The project is operated by Navitas Petroleum Development and Production Ltd (NPDP), a UK-registered subsidiary of Israel-based Navitas Petroleum LP, which holds a 65% working interest. UK-listed Rockhopper Exploration plc holds the remaining 35%. The project is expected to last 35 years and generate around £4 billion in revenue for the Falkland Islands, which has a population of just under 3,700. The development has been a source of diplomatic tension. Argentina, which claims sovereignty over the islands, has declared the project "unilateral and illegitimate", and the involvement of an Israeli-owned operator has created friction between Israel and Argentina.

The British Government has said that development of the field is a matter for the Falkland Islands Government as a devolved entity, and not part of United Kingdom law, stating "Falkland Islanders' right of self-determination extends to the right to exploit their own natural resources".

In December 2025, it was indicated that, after prolonged consideration, Rockhopper Exploration and Navitas Petroleum had taken the final investment decisions for the development of Phase 1 of the field and sanctioned the project. Phase 1, aims to produce 170 mmbbls at a peak production of approximately 50,000 bbls/d. The first oil from Phase 1 was planned for 2028. Argentina immediately rejected these plans with the Argentine foreign ministry stating that Argentina would: “deepen its action plan to adopt all additional measures, in accordance with international law, that it deems necessary to safeguard its sovereign rights and interests.”

== History ==
The field was discovered in 2010 in water depth up to 450 metres (1,480 ft), and an initial estimated reserve of 500 million barrels of oil. The Falklands Basin has been drilled by Shell and Amerada Hess, but they did not discover any oil reserves. The initial drilling phase is expected to produce up to 55,000 barrels of oil per day (bopd), expected to ramp up to 80,000 bopd when the project is in full operation. Estimates for the project predict that the field could yield 400 million barrels of oil over its lifetime, with one oil commentator stating that "I can't remember the last time that amount was discovered in the UK North Sea."

The project is expected to last for 35 years and generate around £4 billion in revenue for the Falkland Islands, (which has a population of just under 3,700), which equates to about £1 million per islander. Whilst the project is expected to be controversial from objections by neighbouring South American countries, the low tax threshold compared with the Great Britain's North Sea oil and gas tax, is favourable. To stimulate investment, Rockhopper sold a 60% stake in the project to Premier Oil in return for a $1 billion investment. By 2025 the lead company involved was Navitas Petroleum who have a 65% stake, with Rockhopper Exploration holding the remaining 35%.

A consultation of the project in summer 2024, seems to have acquired support from the islanders themselves.

=== Discovery and early development (2010–2019) ===
In February 2010, exploratory drilling was begun by Desire Petroleum, but results from the first test well were disappointing. On 6 May 2010, Rockhopper Exploration announced that it may have struck oil, prompting Argentina's Foreign Minister to warn that his country would take all possible lawful steps to impede British oil exploration in the area. On 17 September 2010, Rockhopper published borehole analysis results — the well was drilled in water 451 m deep and a flow test showed a payable oil column of 53 m capable of producing over 2,000 barrels per day. An appraisal programme commenced in February 2011, with results indicating a significant reservoir package flowing oil at better rates than the initial test. On 14 September 2011, Rockhopper announced plans for production to commence in 2016 using FPSO technology. In July 2012, Rockhopper sold a 60% stake to Premier Oil in return for a $1 billion investment to stimulate development. However, the post-2014 oil price slump and the retreat of listed companies from capital-intensive frontier projects left Sea Lion effectively frozen for the remainder of the decade, with the production date pushed back repeatedly. In May 2015, oil was discovered at Isobel Deep by a consortium including Falkland Oil and Gas, Premier Oil, and Rockhopper.

=== Navitas Petroleum's takeover of operatorship (2020–2023) ===
The project was revived with the arrival of Israel's Navitas Petroleum LP in 2020. Initially a minority investor, Navitas became the project's operator and majority owner following the exit of Harbour Energy (which had inherited Premier Oil's position) in 2021–2022. Navitas Petroleum LP is a limited partnership publicly traded on the Tel Aviv Stock Exchange since October 2017. It was co-founded by Gideon Tadmor, who serves as Executive Chairman and is widely recognised as one of the key architects of the Eastern Mediterranean energy sector. Prior to founding Navitas, Tadmor led the discoveries and development of the Tamar and Leviathan natural gas fields as Chairman and CEO of Delek Group's upstream companies. Since its inception, Navitas has raised over US$2.2 billion in equity and debt, predominantly from Israeli capital markets. The operating entity for Sea Lion is Navitas Petroleum Development and Production Ltd (NPDP), a UK-registered company and a fully owned indirect subsidiary of the Israeli parent partnership. Following its entry, Navitas funded 100% of Rockhopper's project costs prior to sanction, effectively reviving an asset that had been financially frozen for years.

=== Final Investment Decision and project details (2024–present) ===
A public consultation in the summer of 2024 garnered widespread support from Falkland Islanders. In November 2025, the Falkland Islands Department of Mineral Resources concluded that the Environmental Impact Statement submitted by Navitas satisfied local legislation. On 10 December 2025, both Navitas and Rockhopper took the final investment decision (FID) for Phase 1 and sanctioned the project. Financial close was completed on 31 December 2025. Phase 1 targets 170 million barrels at a peak production rate of approximately 50,000 barrels per day, with first oil planned for 2028. Phase 2, part of the same approved field development plan, is anticipated to recover a further 149 million barrels. Total gross full-field 2C resources are estimated at 917 million barrels. Navitas's full five-phase development plan involves 64 wells and additional FPSO, extending production over several decades. Total post-FID funding is $1.8 billion to first oil and $2.1 billion to project completion, financed through $1 billion in senior secured debt alongside project equity and first oil revenue. Rockhopper raised approximately $140 million in a conditional placing, stating that commitments came from "new Israeli-based institutional investors" and larger existing shareholders. Between 2 and 7 January 2026, filings with the London Stock Exchange showed that more than 18% of Rockhopper's shares were held by three investment funds based in Tel Aviv and Herzliya. Phase 1 involves drilling 11 subsea wells tied back to a redeployed FPSO vessel, with oil transferred to shuttle tankers. Operational activities will be run from NPDP offices in London, Aberdeen and Stanley.

=== Expansion in the North Falkland Basin ===
In early 2026, Navitas executed a farm-in agreement to acquire a 65% working interest and operatorship in the adjacent PL001 licence in the North Falkland Basin, held by JHI Associates. PL001 covers approximately 1,126 square kilometres and contains an estimated 3.1 billion barrels of prospective recoverable resources.

=== Sovereignty dispute and diplomatic consequences ===
Argentina claims sovereignty over the Falkland Islands and considers all hydrocarbon activity in the surrounding waters illegal without Argentine authorisation. Following the December 2025 FID announcement, Argentina's Foreign Ministry branded the project "unilateral and illegitimate", citing United Nations General Assembly Resolution 2065 (XX) and Resolution 31/49. Both Rockhopper and Navitas have been declared clandestine operators by Argentina — Rockhopper since 2013 and Navitas since 2022 — with 20-year bans on operating in Argentine territory. Israeli Foreign Minister Gideon Sa'ar stated that Navitas was "a publicly traded company" over which the Israeli government had no legal mechanism of control. The tensions were subsequently eased; in April 2026, Argentine President Javier Milei visited Israel for a third time, signed the Isaac Accords with Israeli Prime Minister Benjamin Netanyahu, and reaffirmed the embassy move. The UK Government has stated that "the natural resources of all UK Overseas Territories belong to the individual territories" and that resource development in the Falkland Islands is a devolved matter.

In September 2026, Javier Milei threatened to sanction oil firms working off the Falkland Islands and said his government would file criminal charges against Navitas Petroleum. The same month, a judge in Argentina ordered British and Israeli companies to halt oilfield development.

== Opinions ==
Charles Moore, writing in the Daily Telegraph, argues that Britain should support its overseas territory in this matter as it does not have any strategic reserves of oil. In the future, Great Britain will be required to only source their oil from "bad places", but the Falkland Islands are a key ally, and a friendly source which Great Britain could rely on.

Falklands Conservation were critical of the project stating that "We believe that there is significant corner-cutting in both the gathering of evidence and in the proposed commitments to address environmental impacts. In particular, it fails to provide a firm commitment to offsetting all carbon emissions – the millions of tonnes produced during the development and the more than 100 million tonnes from burning of Falklands oil. Regrettably, the EIS and proposed development is inconsistent with best practice standards, global climate targets and non-polluting developments."

A spokesperson for the UK Government stated that “As the Foreign Secretary set out in his speech on the climate crisis last week [September 2024], we are resetting the UK’s approach to climate and nature by rapidly delivering new, more efficient ways to reduce emissions. Since 2001, the UK has ceased financial support for the fossil fuel energy sector, including in its overseas territories. The natural resources of all UK Overseas Territories belong to the individual territories. Exploration of natural resources on the Falkland Islands is a matter for the Falkland Islands.”

In response, the Falkland Islands Government said “We completely appreciate the UK’s stance on climate change and understand their position on prohibiting any new hydrocarbon licensing within the UKCS, while existing licences are honoured. The matter of development of the natural resources of the Falkland Islands is a devolved matter and is for the people of the Falkland Islands to decide."

After the discovery of the oil field was announced, the foreign minister of Argentina (Jorge Taiana) declared that "..British actions in the region were illegal and unilateral." He also said that his country would take all "lawful steps to impede British oil exploration and production" in the region.

== Geology ==
The petroleum survey area of the Falkland Islands is in the sea to the north of the islands, covers 400,000 km^{2}, and contains several sedimentary basins from the Mesozoic era. After conducting seismic reflection studies and three-dimensional exploration, six test wells were drilled. Five of the six wells produced samples of petroleum. However, none produced indications of commercial amounts.

According to British Geological Survey studies led by the geologist Phil Richards, the petroleum occurs at 2,700 metres below sea level and a maximum generation would be found beginning at 3,000 metres below sea level. The main petroleum source rocks have still not been penetrated because they are located at a depth deeper than 3,000 metres. It is considered probable that more than 60 billion barrels have been generated, that is, produced by natural forces, in deposits in the North Falkland Basin. These figures are based on the studies of pyrolysis obtained from wells and assume the existence of a mature rock interval of 400 metres thickness and covering an area of 40 by 40 km.

However, even with more conservative figures for the thickness and surface area of the source rock, the rich potential generator of petroleum, it is calculated that significant quantities can be extracted. For example, in an area of mature rock 35 by 12 km and 200 metres thick more than 11.5 billion barrels of petroleum could exist, including the production of 8 kilograms of hydrocarbon per tonne.

The brown lacustrine sediments are similar to the lacustrine source rocks of the Upper Permian to the south from the Junggar basin, which are among the richest source rocks for oil in the world. According to calculations of the Potential Production Index (obtained when multiplying the organic content of the rock by its thickness and potential production of hydrocarbons) they suggest the rocks of the North Falkland basin are second only to the Junggar basin in petroleum potential.

Although the wells indicate a potentially productive source rock, they also indicate that many of the target reservoirs are composed of volcaniclastic rocks with low porosity due to secondary mineralisation and are thus unlikely to store hydrocarbons in large quantities. This is not an anomalous view based solely on published data from one well, but based on information from multiple sources. Volcaniclastic-rich deposits are probably present in many parts of the basin, which is to be expected, given the major volcanic sediment source that lay to the west at the time of sedimentary deposition.

=== The petroleum system in the North Falkland Basin ===
The petroleum exploration discovered a system of source rock in the North Falkland Basin capable of generating more than 102 kg of hydrocarbons per tonne of rock. Although a great portion of the thickness of the source rock is geologically immature, it is capable of generating hydrocarbons below 2,000 metres. The rock generating the largest quantity of hydrocarbons is located at a depth of nearly 3,000 metres. The calculations of the volume of rock that lies just inside the bordering fringe of the petroleum deposit ranges from 36 billion cubic metres to 400 billion cubic metres, depending on the interpretation of the seismic survey data. In general, it is believed that the basin could have generated up to 60 billion barrels of petroleum. The petroleum exploration discovered that under the principal interval of source rock is a layer of sandstone approximately 100 metres thick with porosities reaching 30%. Up to now, very few sandstones with good reserve properties have been found in the succession of rifts below the interval of principal source rock, but very few wells have penetrated into this zone.

The absence of high pressure in the basin suggests that whatever quantity of petroleum was produced could have migrated laterally and thus could be trapped in rift reservoirs developed below and to the side of the source rock and could function—given its low level of porosity—as a seal for the deeper rock and would only be cut on the borders where it is intruded upon by faults.
