= Isobel deep =

Isobel Deep is a sector of the South Atlantic Ocean, to the North of the Falkland Islands in an area known as the North Falklands Basin. Oil was discovered in Isobel Deep in May 2015 by a consortium of oil companies including Falkland Oil and Gas, Premier Oil, and Rockhopper Oil & Gas.
