= Afrino sheep =

Breed of sheep

Afrino
- Country of origin: South Africa
- Distribution: South Africa
- Type: Fine wool
- Use: Meat, wool

The Afrino is a breed of sheep originating from South Africa. It was developed by crossing Ronderib Afrikaner sheep with Merino and South African Mutton Merino (SAMM) sheep, and is classified as a Merino breed.

The Afrino was developed at the Carnarvon Research Station. It was made using 25% Afrikaner, 25% Merino and 50% SAMM genetics. This allowed scientists to combine the improved wool and carcass traits of the Merino and SAMM with the indigenous Afrikaner breed that was suited to the environmental conditions of South Africa.

It is a minor, dual-purpose breed farmed for meat and wool in South Africa. It produces fine wool. The Afrino is also used as a terminal sire in meat production to increase early growth in lambs and reach slaughter weight sooner. It has a relatively low rate of inbreeding compared to other South African breeds.
