= Rockhopper Exploration =

British oil and gas exploration company

Rockhopper Exploration PLC
- Company type: Public limited company
- Traded as: AIM: RKH
- ISIN: GB00B0FVQX23
- Industry: Oil and gas industry
- Founded: 2004
- Headquarters: Salisbury, Wiltshire, United Kingdom
- Number of locations: Falkland Islands
- Area served: Falkland Islands
- Key people: Pierre Jungels CBE (Chairman); Sam Moody; CEO
- Services: Oil exploration and production
- Net income: -$87.2m (2010)
- Number of employees: 13
- Website: www.rockhopperexploration.co.uk

Rockhopper Exploration PLC is an oil and gas exploration company headquartered in Salisbury, Wiltshire, United Kingdom. It owns offshore exploration and production licences in the North Falkland Basin in the waters north of the Falkland Islands.

Rockhopper is listed on the Alternative Investment Market of the London Stock Exchange.

== History ==
Rockhopper was founded in 2004 to explore for oil and gas in the Falkland Islands. It received a listing on the AIM market in 2005. On 16 April 2010, Rockhopper commenced drilling of its first exploration well, 14/10-B (subsequently renamed 14/10-2) on its Sea Lion prospect using the Ocean Guardian semi-submersible drilling rig. On 6 May 2010 the company announced it had made the first oil discovery in the Falkland Islands in well 14/10-2. An update of the first appraisal drill (well 14/10-4) was released in March 2011 indicating a significant reservoir package with a downhole mini drill stem test flowing oil at better rates than in a September 2010 flow test on well 14/10-2. Confidence in the commerciality of the Sea Lion discovery was increased by this first appraisal. On 27 June 2011, the company announced that its second Sea Lion appraisal well (14/10-5) flowed at commercially viable rates. In July 2012, Rockhopper announced that it had entered into a conditional farm out agreement with Premier Oil plc whereby Premier will acquire 60% of Rockhopper's interests in its North Falkland Basin licences in exchange for an upfront cash payment of $231m, a contribution of $722m to Rockhopper's share of the Sea Lion development costs and a net exploration carry of $48m. Rockhopper will be fully funded on its share of the Sea Lion development through the contribution to costs and standby financing provided by Premier. First oil from Sea Lion had been expected in 2020. However, the project faced delays and was again reinvigorated with the rise in energy prices in 2022.

In 2023, Rockhopper (working with Tel Aviv-listed Navitas Petroleum) said it had been presented with a new development plan for its Sea Lion project, that aimed to cut costs, and proceed in phases. It was stated that: "If realized, the new plan — with a total price tag of $2.2 billion — could lead to 80,000 barrels per day of production (up to 100,000 b/d at peak) via a leased floating production, storage and offloading unit". A final investment decision was targeted for early 2024.

In December 2025, after some delay, it was indicated that Rockhopper Exploration and Navitas Petroleum had taken the final investment decisions for the development of Phase 1 of the Sea Lion Field and sanctioned the project. Phase 1, aims to produce 170 mmbbls at a peak production of approximately 50,000 bbls/d. The first oil from Phase 1 was planned for 2028. Argentina immediately rejected these plans with the Argentine foreign ministry stating that Argentina would: “deepen its action plan to adopt all additional measures, in accordance with international law, that it deems necessary to safeguard its sovereign rights and interests.”

== Licences ==
Rockhopper holds interests in production licences PL023, PL024, PL032 and PL033 covering approximately 3800 km^{2}. In 2005 it farmed into licences PL003 and PL004 operated by Desire Petroleum plc. In 2011, Rockhopper increased its share of PL004b from 7.5% to 60.0% and in PL004c from 7.5% to 25.0%. Licence PL004b contains an extension to the Sea Lion field as well as the Beverley, Casper and Casper South discoveries.

== See also ==
- Energy and minerals in the Falkland Islands
- Falkland Oil and Gas, a company acquired by Rockhopper which also drilled off the coast of the Falklands
