= Desire Petroleum =

English oil and gas exploration company

Desire Petroleum plc
- Company type: Public limited company
- Industry: Hydrocarbon exploration
- Founded: 1996
- Founder: Colin Phipps
- Headquarters: Malvern, England
- Key people: Dr Ian Duncan (Chief Executive)
- Services: Oil exploration and production
- Net income: -£1.47m (2008)

Desire Petroleum plc was an oil and gas exploration company headquartered in Malvern, England. It owned offshore exploration and production licences in the North Falkland Basin in the waters north of the Falkland Islands and its core focus was to develop the basin into a major new hydrocarbon province.

Desire Petroleum was acquired by Falkland Oil and Gas for £61million on 5 December 2013. Falkland Oil & Gas was itself acquired by Rockhopper Exploration plc in November 2015.

== History ==
Desire Petroleum was founded in 1996 by Dr Colin Phipps, a former geologist for Royal Dutch Shell. The company was named after Desire, the ship, captained by John Davis, which discovered the Falkland Islands in 1592. In 1998 the company was floated on the Alternative Investment Market.

Desire Petroleum were awarded licences for drilling in the Falklands in 1997, and test drilling was carried out in 1998. Oil was not found in commercial quantities, and the price of oil, until 2007-8 was not high enough to make it viable, and exploration companies left the area. A 3D seismic survey was acquired in 2004 which showed great oil potential.

=== 2010-11 drilling programme ===
In February 2010 Desire began a programme of exploratory drilling, with costs shared by farming out drilling slots to Rockhopper Exploration (of Salisbury, Wiltshire) and Falkland Oil & Gas Ltd, in the North Falkland Basin. In the northern section of the basin this covers the prospects of Rachel, Kath, Pam, Ann, Anna, Liz, South Orca, Ninky, Beth, Jayne and Helen. In the southern section are Dawn, Alpha, Kate, Ruth and Barbara.

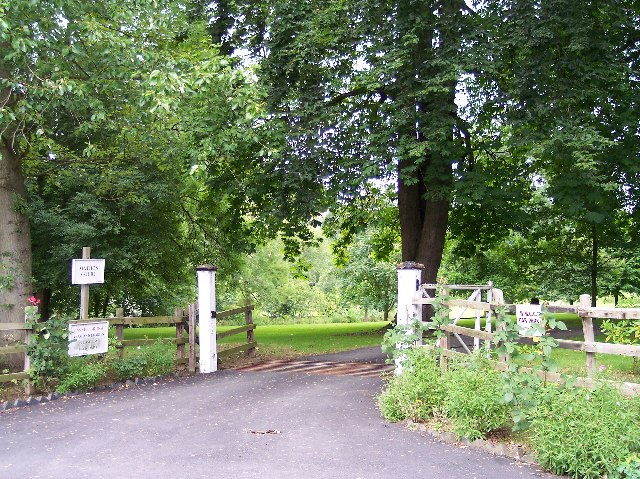
Entrance to Mathon Court, headquarters of Desire Petroleum

The first well was categorised as a gas discovery, with one other gas event and two sets of oil shows encountered. Stock market disappointment that the first well was not an immediate commercial discovery of oil led to an immediate slump in share price, though Desire continue to analyse the data gathered in order to assist with the remainder of the drilling programme.

The second well, drilling for partner company Rockhopper Exploration, was an oil discovery which further confirmed the geological model for the North Falkland Basin for Desire and Rockhopper's remaining prospects.

== Acquisition ==
The company was sold in December 2013 to Falkland Oil and Gas for £61million.
