= South African Meat Merino =

Breed of sheep

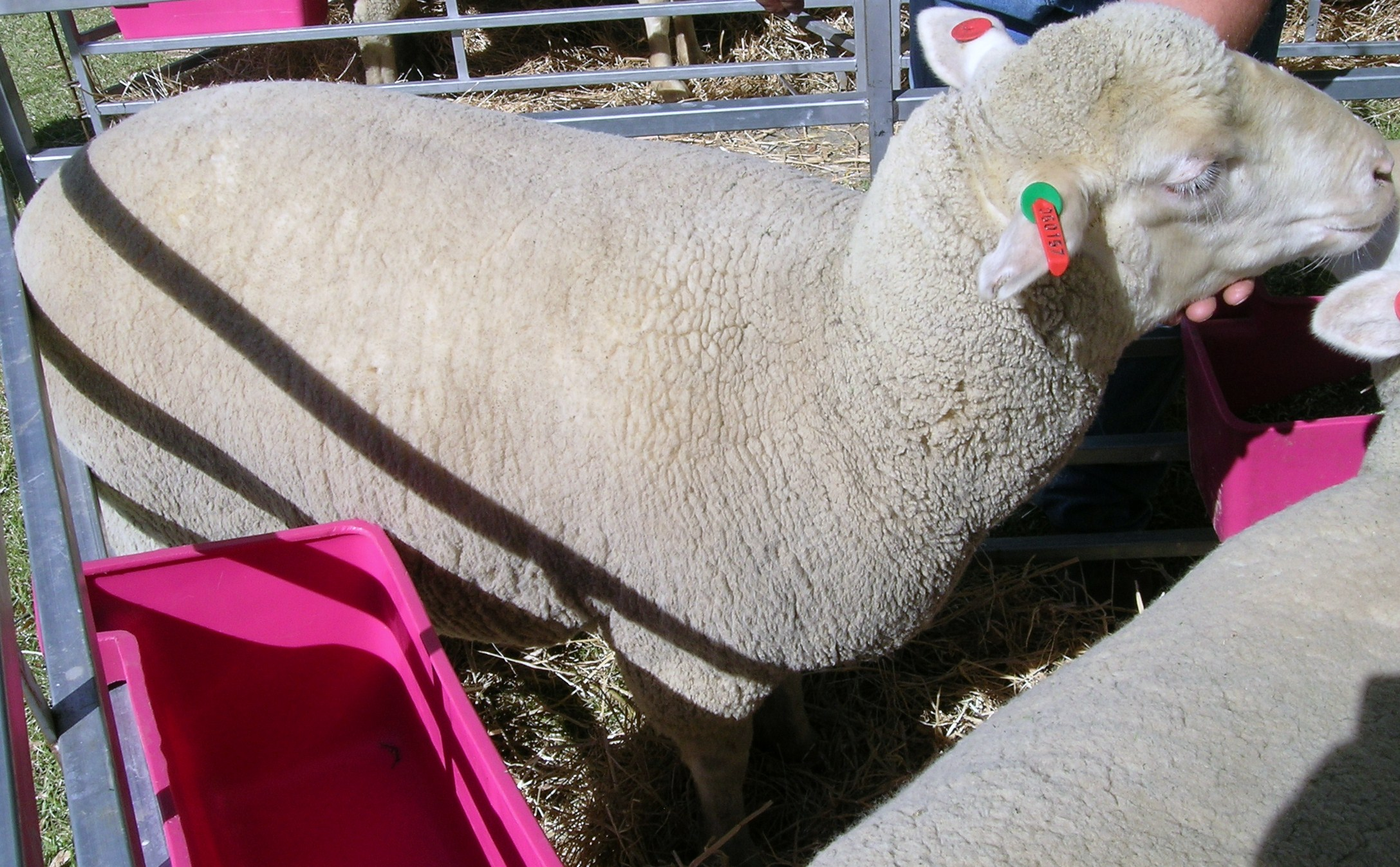
- Country of origin: South Africa
- Use: meat, wool

Traits
- Wool color: White

The South African Meat Merino or SAMM is a wool and meat sheep originating in South Africa, but now found throughout the world.

The SAMM is derived from the German Merinofleischschaf animals imported into South Africa from Europe in 1932, to improve the quality of wool and meat from sheep in South Africa. The Deutsche Fleisch Merino is a common meat sheep in Germany, Austria, and Poland. In South Africa, the German name was translated into Afrikaans as Duitse Vleis Merino and then into English as "German Mutton Merino". The South African breed was recognised as separate in 1971 when the name was changed to South African Mutton Merino.

The SAMM has been developed as a versatile, hardy, polled dual-purpose breed. Ewes have a good maternal instinct and high milk production. Mature ewes will grow up to about 95 kg (209 lb) and rams to over 100 kg (220 lb). Ewes will produce 3.5 kg (7.7 lb) to 4.5 kg (9.9 lb) of medium/strong wool. The wool is classified separately from the higher quality wool of Merinos, to avoid the risk of contamination of the latter with hair and kemp fibre from the SAMM wool.

The SAMM is bred specifically to produce a slaughter lamb at an early age (35 kg (77 lb) at 100 days of age). In judging SAMMs the emphasis is on conformation (in relation to producing meat), 60%, and not on the animal's wool (40%).

SAMM rams have almost entirely replaced British breeds as terminal sires in the harsh regions of South Africa, where they (and their hybrids) are more adaptable than the former breeds. They were first imported into Australia in 1996. Also in 1996, Peggy Newman imported SAMM embryos from South Africa creating the first SAMM flock in Canada. In 1999, Dwight and Gwendolyn Kitzan from Nisland, South Dakota – USA, imported one of Newman’ embryo SAMM ram and have been developing the SAMM breed in the United States using top Australian SAMM producers bloodlines.
