= Navitas Land and Mineral Corporation =

Oil and gas exploration company

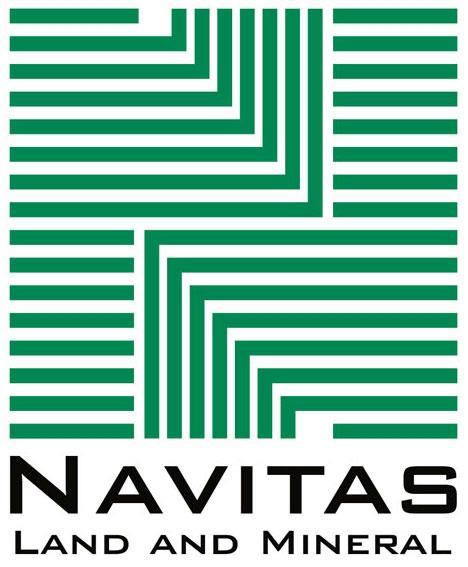
- Company type: Private
- Industry: Oil and gas
- Founded: 2009
- Headquarters: Madisonville, Kentucky, U.S.
- Area served: Illinois Basin
- Key people: Daniel W. Williams (President & CEO)
- Website: NavitasLandandMineral.com

Navitas Land and Mineral Corporation is an oil and gas exploration, development and production firm headquartered in Madisonville, Kentucky. Founded in 2009, the company's oil and gas recovery efforts are focused on the Illinois Basin, an area that encompasses Western Kentucky, Southern Illinois, and Southwestern Indiana.

== History ==
President and CEO Daniel Williams founded Navitas Land and Mineral in 2009 on the premise that “oil is where oil was” and began reworking fields that had once been productive.

In April 2011 the company drilled its first new oil well on the Oakley lease located in Hopkins County, Kentucky. By the fall of 2011, Navitas had drilled 13 additional wells nearby.

Navitas Land and Mineral also reopened an oil field in Poole, Kentucky that had once been owned and operated by the Sinclair Oil Corporation. Navitas employed Enhanced Oil Recovery (EOR) techniques that included carbon dioxide injection (CO_{2}) and water flooding to capture previously untapped resources near wells that had been plugged and closed off for more than thirty years.

By June 2013, Navitas Land and Mineral had drilled 54 new wells. The company's deepest well, the Otho Babb #2, was drilled to a total depth of 7008 feet and has the distinction of being the deepest producible well ever drilled in Webster County, Kentucky. Deeper wells previously drilled in the area were dry and abandoned, according to the Kentucky Geological Survey.

== Operations ==
Navitas Land and Mineral's oil and gas recovery efforts are focused on the Illinois Basin, an interior Cratonic basin with estimates for future recoverable reserves at 4.1 billion barrels.

Navitas begins developing a new field by implementing a work-over and drilling program that may involve water removal or pump maintenance. Navitas also uses new technologies to access oil and natural gas reserves that were missed in the original production of a well. In less than ten percent of its recovery efforts, the company may employ fracturing of formation structures to create better channels of oil and gas flow.

Navitas Land and Mineral seeks to acquire oil and gas assets of merit and develops them to their full potential through both conventional drilling and enhancement methods as well as low-cost, non-conventional processes to dramatically improve oil and gas recovery.
