= Navitas Petroleum =

Israeli petroleum exploration and development company

Navitas Petrochemical
- Native name: נאוויטס פטרוליום
- Type: Public company
- Traded as: TASE: NVPT.L
- Industry: Petroleum industry
- Founded: 2015; 11 years ago
- Founder: Gideon Tadmor
- Headquarters: Herzliya, Israel
- Revenue: ▲ ₪42.919 million (2020)
- Net income: ▼ -₪15.912 million (2020)
- Total assets: ▲ ₪287.399 million (2020)
- Total equity: ▲ ₪85.445 million (2020)
- Website: www.navitaspet.com

Navitas Petroleum is a publicly traded oil and natural gas exploration and production partnership focused on North America. Navitas is listed on the Tel Aviv Stock Exchange (TICKER: NVPT.L) and is part of the Tel-Aviv 125 index, which includes the largest traded companies in Tel Aviv. The company has offices in Herzliya, Israel, Houston, Texas, and London, UK.

== Key Persons ==
Gideon Tadmor co-founded Navitas and serves as the partnership's executive chairman. Tadmor has previously held various leadership roles, including chairman of Delek Drilling Limited Partnership (NewMed Energy) and founder and CEO of Avner Oil and Gas LP. He has been a pioneer in major natural gas discoveries, including the Tamar, Leviathan, and Aphrodite fields offshore Israel and Cyprus. Tadmor and his team have been involved in the exploration, development, and production of oil and gas assets for over 30 years. Other founding partners at Navitas include Koby Katz, the deputy chairman, who previously served as the Director General of the Israeli Ministry of National Infrastructure, Energy, and Water, as well as co-CEO of Delek Energy and chairman of Delek Drilling.

Amit Kornhauser is the CEO of Navitas Petroleum, having held the position since January 2022. Prior to this role, Kornhauser served as CFO of Navitas Petroleum for five years and, before that, was CFO of Delek Energy, which was involved in the establishment and leadership of Israeli offshore natural gas discoveries.

== History ==
Navitas Petroleum began trading on the Tel Aviv Stock Exchange in October 2017. The partnership has focused on acquiring proven oil and gas discoveries mainly on early at stages of development. Since its inception, Navitas has raised over USD 2.2 billion in equity and debt from public markets. As of December 2023, Navitas' asset portfolio includes 10 oil and gas assets, comprising producing assets and proven discoveries in the United States Gulf of Mexico and the Falkland Islands. In September 2026, Argentina's president Javier Milei said his government would file criminal charges against Navitas Petroleum for its development of the Sea Lion Field near the disputed Falkland Islands.

== Operations ==
Navitas Petroleum primary assets include the Buckskin and Shenandoah oil discoveries in the Gulf of Mexico off the coast of the United States, as well as the Sea Lion project in the Falkland Islands.
