= Geology of the Falkland Islands =

Map of the Falkland Islands

The geology of the Falkland Islands is described in several publications. The Falkland Islands are located on a projection of the Patagonian continental shelf. In ancient geological time this shelf was part of Gondwana, which around 400 million years ago broke from what is now Africa and drifted westwards relative to Africa. Studies of the seabed surrounding the islands indicated the possibility of oil. Intensive exploration began in 1996, although there had been some earlier seismic surveys in the region.

== Geological history ==
=== Proterozoic Eon and Paleozoic Era ===
Location of the Falkland Islands in Gondwana

The geological history of the Falkland Islands began more than a thousand million years ago (Mya), before they existed as separate islands. From its earliest history the Falklands Islands has been linked to South America. Evidence from xenoliths suggests that the lithosphere of Deseado Massif in southern Patagonia formed 2100 to 1000 Mya in the Paleo and Mesoproterozoic. Since these times the Falklands Islands and Deseado Massif have formed a single tectonic block. Like today both regions were next to each other during the Neoproterozoic when they formed part of the ancient supercontinent of Rodinia.

About 290 million years ago, in the Carboniferous period, an ice age engulfed the area as glaciers advanced from the polar region, eroding and transporting rocks. These rocks were deposited as extensive moraines and glacial till. When the glacial sediments were turned into stone they formed the rocks that now make up the Fitzroy Tillite Formation in the Falklands. Identical rocks are found in southern Africa.

=== Mesozoic Era ===
The breakup of Gondwana in the Mesozoic Era led to the formation of a large number of minor crustal fragments, including the Falkland Islands. At first, the fragment containing the islands separated from the southeastern part of Africa on a section that would become Antarctica and later rotated by almost 180°. The interior of Gondwana was based on crystalline rocks more than a billion years old; in the Falklands today these are found in the Cape Meredith complex. Sand and mud filled and eventually covered the developing continental rifts. Later these sediments covering the rifts hardened into rock. These rock sequences from Gondwana's break-up can be identified in places as far apart as South Africa, western Antarctica and Brazil. In the Falkland Islands, these sequences are known as the West Falkland Group.

Two hundred million years ago, tectonic forces tore Gondwana apart. Sheets of liquid basalt intruded into the cracks that formed between the sedimentary layers. The resulting solidified sheets can now be seen in the form of dikes that cut the oldest sedimentary layers, those that lie principally in the southern part of East Falkland and in South Africa.

Tectonic forces continued to form the region: a mountainous chain formed, part of which now forms Wickham Heights on East Falkland Island and extends westwards through West Falkland into the Jason Islands. A basin developed and was filled with land-based, or terrigenous, sediments. These layers of sand and mud filled the basin as it sank; as they hardened, they produced the rocks of the sedimentary Lafonia Group of the Falklands. These rocks are similar to those in southern Africa's Karoo basin.

== Geological structure ==
The oldest rocks in the Falklands are gneiss and granite in the Cape Meredith complex, which radiometric studies place at around 1100 million years old. These types of rocks are visible in cliffs at the south end of West Falkland. The Cape Meredith complex corresponds to the crystalline rocks that made up the interior of the Gondwana supercontinent. This type of rock also has a great geological similarity to rocks currently found in South Africa and in Queen Maud Land in Antarctica. On top of the gneiss and granite lie layers of quartzite, sandstone, and shales or mudstone in West Falkland. Cross-bedding and ripple marks identify the zone where these rocks were deposited as the shallow waters of a delta environment where currents transported submarine sediments. In the case of the Falklands these palaeocurrent directions mostly run northward, and are very similar to those in formations in South Africa that run southward. Comparison of the two provides evidence that the block of sandstone sediments that contains the islands has rotated. Rocks in the central part of West Falkland contain fossils of marine organisms that lived in shallow water.

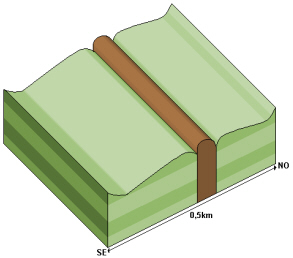
Formation of basalt dikes

=== Formation of basalt dikes ===
The plain of Lafonia is made of the arenaceous, or sandy, sediments of the Lafonia Group. Depressions in the sediments formed where they were cut by vertical basalt dikes. The dike is revealed by the erosion of the less resistant rock matrix; this can be observed on Lively Island. In West Falkland there are several dikes that cut the rocks of the West Falkland group, but these dykes, unlike the previous ones, are chemically more unstable and have eroded. The only indication of their existence is the aligned linear depressions. In the margins of these depressions there is evidence of contact baking or hornfels formation adjacent to the once molten basalt dyke.

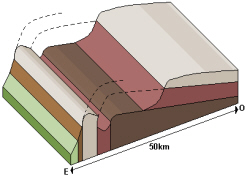
Folding of West Falkland

=== Folding of West Falkland ===
Most of the layers of West Falkland and its satellite islands are slightly inclined from the horizontal. This inclination shows different types from rocks in different places. The quartzites of Port Stephens and Stanley are more resistant than the arenaceous sediments of the formation at Fox Bay. The Hornby Mountains, near Falkland Sound have experienced tectonic forces of uplift and folding by which the beds of the West Falkland Group, the Fitzroy Tillite and the Lafonia Group are inclined to the vertical.

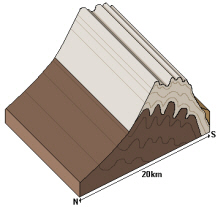
Folding of East Falkland Island

=== Folding of East Falkland ===
Where East Falkland is underlain by rocks from the West Falkland Group, the rock layers are severely deformed. The layers are tightly folded with steep to vertical dips. The very soft rocks near the Fox Bay Formation are highly susceptible to erosion. The hardest quartzites are more resistant and have created a very irregular landscape with steeply inclined rock layers found along the length of the mountain chain on East Falkland from the city of Stanley westward to Wickham Heights.

== Glaciation and weathering ==
The effects of the ice age erosion that occurred in the Pleistocene glaciation between 25,000 and 15,000 years ago are visible in the islands. The tops of the hills have been exposed to most of the effects of freezing and thawing. Also, the strong winds that are characteristic of the region carry sand grains up to heights of a metre above ground level; the resulting sand-blasting causes rocks and pillar-shaped rock structures to show the most erosion in their lowest exposed levels, at one metre and below. This unique pattern of erosion is evident in the higher elevations of West Falkland where quartzites of the Port Stephens Formation are exposed at the surface. During the last glaciation, snow that accumulated year after year formed glaciers in some elevated leeward zones. These and previous glaciers modified the landscape on the eastern mountain slopes that were protected from the westerly winds. The reason for glacier accumulation on the eastern slopes could be that the climate could have been very dry, or that the prevailing wind prevented glaciers from forming in places other than eastern slopes.

Another effect of glaciation can be seen on East Falkland in the basins called glacial cirques that were created on Mount Usborne. On West Falkland there are glacial cirques on Mount Adam and on the Hornby mountains. Several of these hold tarns, or small cirque ponds.

Rock flows or moraines are another characteristic left by glaciation. In the Falklands, these generally occur only at the mouth of the cirques, although in one valley they extend some 3 km south of the drainage divide that was the likely ice source; north of this same divide, a closer-in moraine loop dams in a small lake. These moraines are morphologically quite different from the very widespread stone runs, which are the result of periglacial processes.

All the boulders in the stone runs are remnants of quartzites that were repeatedly ground down from repeated weathering, perhaps by a combination of frost action and thermal fatigue. They are found principally in the Port Stanley Beds and to a lesser degree in the Port Stephens Formation. Excavations show that the colour of the upper parts of the rocks is different from the lower part. This is due to rainwater erosion that has whitened the stones and left them a light grey colour. Below ground level, where the rocks have been protected from erosion, they acquire an orange colour from iron oxide.

== Geological map ==
Geological map of the Falkland Islands

Age	Formation	Lithologies
Jurassic	Intrusive dikes	Basalt and dolerite
Carboniferous-Permian	Lafonia Group	Sandstone and mudstone
Carboniferous-Permian	Fitzroy Tillite Formation	Glacial mud and boulders
Silurian-Devonian (West Falkland Group)	Port Stanley Formation	Quartzite
Silurian-Devonian (West Falkland Group)	Fox Bay and Port Philomel Formations	Sandstone and mudstone
Silurian-Devonian (West Falkland Group)	Port Stephens Formation	Quartzite
Precambrian	Cape Meredith Complex	Gneiss and granite

== North Falkland Basin ==
The sedimentary material that fills the north part of North Falkland basin is divided in eight tectonic-stratigraphic geological units. A geologic unit is a volume of rock or ice of identifiable origin and age that is defined by distinctive characteristics. At present the biostratigraphic information collected is not sufficient to establish a stratigraphical sequence based on palynological and paleontological data. Also, the lithostratigraphical units are useful to describe the stratigraphy only of individual wells, but are not useful to make comparisons since there are lateral lithological variations between the units.

The North Falkland basin was where the fluvial-lacustrine (river-lake) deposition took place during the first and last stages of crest formation in the area, which created a permanent lake toward the end of the process of the subsidence or sinking of the crest. At the end of the formation of the crest, a process of sedimentation occurred that formed various delta systems, creating a large system of lakes.

Toward the end of the tectonic uplift, sedimentation occurred within several deltaic systems in a great system of lakes. Towards the end of the post-uplift phase, from the end of the early Albian or Cenomanian to the beginning of the late Paleocene, the North Falkland basin was characterized by the initial establishment of marginal coastal conditions and finally totally marine conditions, as a marine connection with the basin was formed. In the case of the Falkland basin, the marine conditions began in the early Jurassic and continued in the San Jorge River basin to the northwest, which suggests that marine conditions spread northwards from the south. The process of uplift in the Paleocene was followed by a process of tectonic subsidence in addition to the marine-deltaic deposition that took place during the rest of the Cenozoic period.

== See also ==
- Drainage basin
- Depression (geology)
- Geological fold
- Geologic unit
- Lithostratigraphy
- Maturity (geology)
- Paleontology
- Palynology
- Petroleum geology
- reflection seismology
- Sequence stratigraphy
- Sedimentary basin
- Structural basin
- Stone runs
