= Falkland Oil and Gas =

Energy company registered in the Falkland Islands

Falkland Oil and Gas Ltd
- Type: Public
- Traded as: LSE: FOGL
- ISIN: FK00B030JM18
- Industry: Oil and gas extraction
- Founded: 27 May 2004
- Defunct: January 2016
- Successor: Rockhopper Exploration
- Headquarters: London, United Kingdom
- Area served: Falkland Islands
- Key people: Richard Liddell (Chairman); Tim Bushell (CEO)
- Revenue: None
- Operating income: -£4,404,000 (2014)
- Net income: -£3,232,000 (2014)
- Total assets: £357,317,000 (2014)
- Total equity: £349,781,000 (2014)
- Number of employees: 7
- Website: www.fogl.com

Falkland Oil and Gas Ltd, abbreviated to FOGL, was an energy company registered in the Falkland Islands and headquartered in London, the United Kingdom. Its business was based on exploring for offshore oil reserves off the coast of the Falklands. It owned the right to extract oil from a number of blocks to the east and the south of the islands.

FOGL was listed on the Alternative Investment Market of the London Stock Exchange. The company issued an initial public offering on 14 October 2004, debuting at a price of 40p. By 2010, FOGL estimated that its four best prospects could contain 8 billion barrels (1.3 billion cubic metres), with up to 60 billion barrels (9.5 billion cubic metres) in total in all sectors off the coasts of the Falklands. The share price peaked at 267p in June 2010, but slumped by half on 12 July 2010, when it was found that one of its prospect wells, Toroa, was empty. As of 1 March 2015, the share price had dropped to ~31 pence.

The company merged with Rockhopper Exploration on 18 January 2016.

== Operations ==
North Falkland Basin in millions (10^{6}) barrels and cubic metre of oil equivalent.

Prospect Name	Estimated Resources (10^{6} bbl)	Estimated Resources (10^{6} m^{3})	Start date	Results and/or notes
Zebedee	281	44.7	April 2015	40 percent owned by Falklands Oil and Gas, 36 percent by Premier Oil and 24 percent by Rockhopper Exploration. On the 2 April, during the first of the 4 planned wells at Zebedee a 27.9 meter oil reservoir and 18.5 meter gas reservoir was found (this was better than expected.)
Isobel Deep	240	38	May 2015	
Jayne East	85	13.5	June 2015	

South and East Falkland Basin in millions (10^{6}) barrels and cubic metre of oil equivalent.

Prospect Name	Estimated Resources (10^{6} bbl)	Estimated Resources (10^{6} m^{3})	Start date	Results and/or notes
Humpback	510	81	July 2015	Part of Diomedea fan complex. WI 52.5% / PI 27.5%. Net prospective resources 268 Million barrels. Operator Noble energy (35%), Partner Edison (12.5%)
Stingray				Part of Diomedea fan complex. Requires success at Humpback. Operated by Noble
Scharnhorst North	335	53.3	Q1 2015	Part of Fault Block Area. Noble operated
Starfish	402	63.9	Q1	Part of Hersilia Fan Complex. Operated by Noble
Well 2	300 to 400	48 to 64	August 2015	
Scotia			November 2012	Gas shows - proven working hydrocarbon system but poor quality reservoir
Loligo			September 2012	Gas bearing zones but poor quality reservoir
Toroa			July 2010	Dry - but excellent Cretaceous reservoirs

== Legal issues ==
Due to the ongoing disputed nature of the Falkland Islands, FOGL received criticism from Argentina. On 30 April 2014 FOGL announced the following in their annual report;

Argentina legal issue
It is well documented that Argentina claims sovereignty over the Falkland Islands and the surrounding maritime areas. The Argentine government has recently stated that it intends to take legal action against companies and individuals with regards to this claim. Neither FOGL, nor any of its Directors have received any written notification or legal documents from the Argentine Government with respect to such actions. FOGL's position on this issue is clear. The Hydrocarbons Law (Law No 26.659) enacted by the government of Argentina does not apply to the Falkland Islands or its surrounding waters, and is therefore unlawful. Any attempts to enforce Argentine domestic legislation in relation to the Falkland Islands continental shelf are an unlawful assertion of extraterritorial jurisdiction. As such, Argentina's action is contrary to the UN Convention of the Law of the Sea. It is also unlawful interference with the right of the Falkland Islanders under the UN Charter to selfdetermination, their right to develop their hydrocarbons resources and the peaceful development of their economy.

—
