= List of Australian and New Zealand sheep breeds =

This is a list of sheep breeds usually considered to originate or have developed in Australia and New Zealand. Some may have complex or obscure histories, so inclusion here does not necessarily imply that a breed is predominantly or exclusively from those countries.

Name	Notes	Conservation status	Image
Arapawa Island	Found primarily on Arapaoa Island.	Rare	
Australian Merino			
BLM			
Bond Corriedale			
Booroola Leicester			
Booroola Merino			
Borderdale			
Borino			
Broomfield Corriedale			
Bundoran Comeback			
Bungaree Merino			
Camden			
Camden Park			
Campbell Island			
Carpetmaster			
Chevlin			
Comeback			
Coolalee			
Coopworth			
Cormo			
Corriedale			
Dormer			
Drysdale	Developed from New Zealand Romney in 1931 at Massey Agricultural Centre, New Zealand	Endangered (2007)	
Elliotdale			
Fonthill Merino			
Glen Vale			
Gromark			
Hampshire Down			
Hokonui			
Hyfer			
Mohaka			
New Zealand Romney			
Peppin Merino			
Perendale			
Pitt Island			
Poll Dorset			
Poll Merino			
Polwarth			
Romsdown			
Siromeat			
Skye Farm Romney			
South Australian Merino			
South Dorset Down			
South Down			
South Hampshire			
South Suffolk			
Tasmanian Merino			
Trangie Fertility			
Tukidale			
Waridale			
White Suffolk			
Wiltipoll			
Zenith			
