= Australian Merino =

Australian breed of sheep

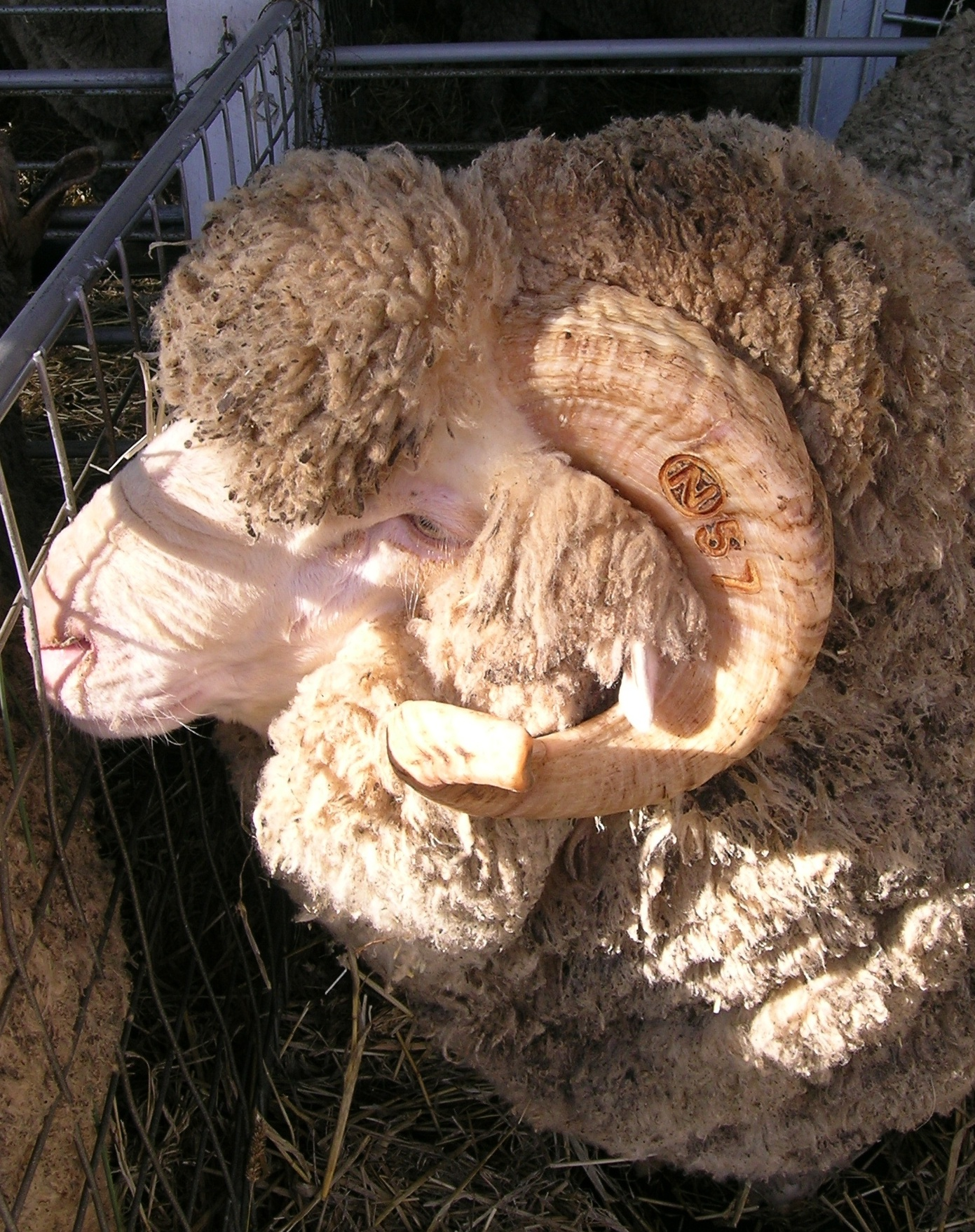
- Head of a ram

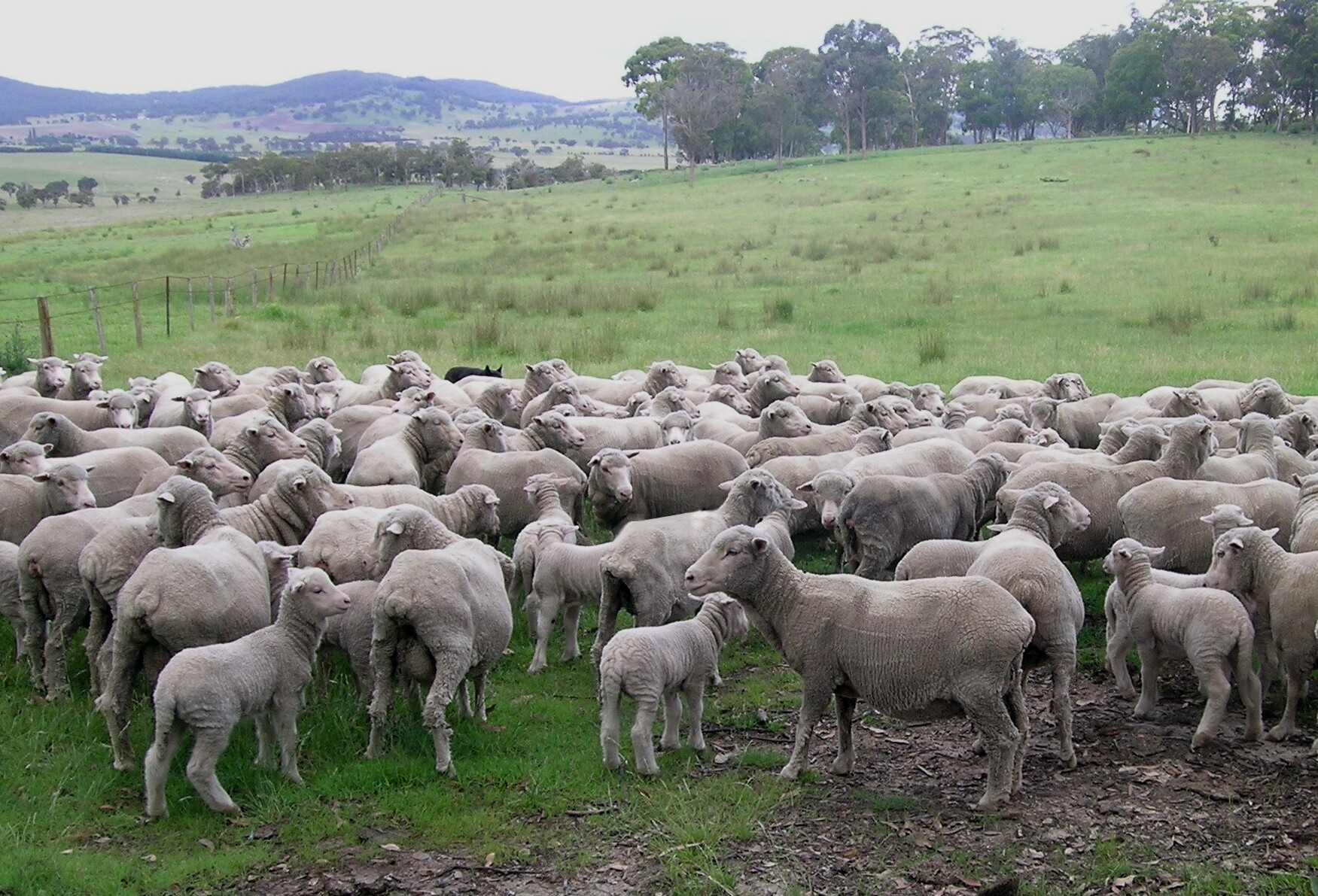
- Ewes and lambs
- Conservation status: FAO (2007): not at risk; DAD-IS (2021): unknown
- Country of origin: Australia
- Distribution: Australia; New Zealand
- Use: meat; wool

Traits
- Horn status: Poll Merino: polled; other breeds: rams horned, ewes polled

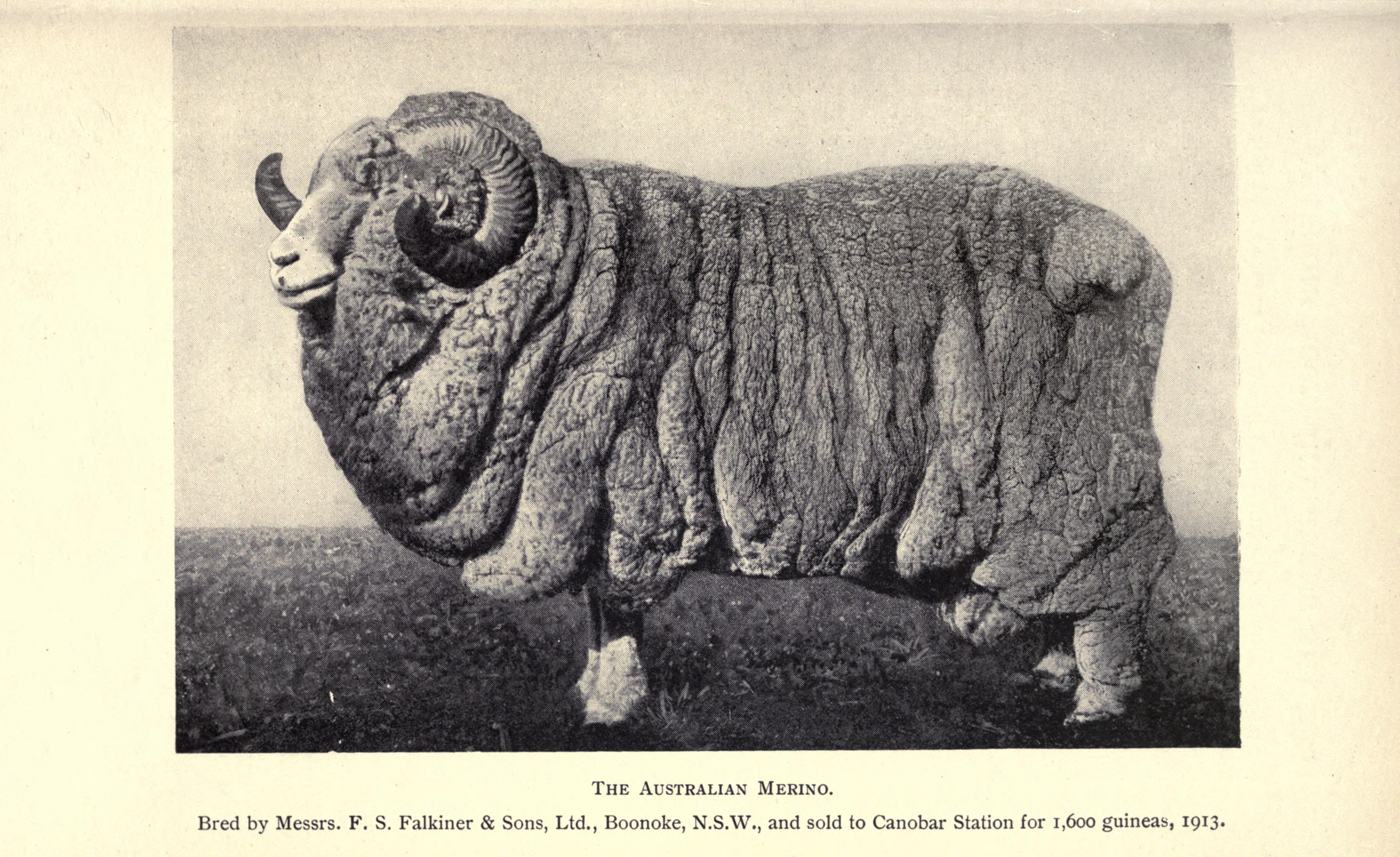
Champion ram, 1913

The Australian Merino is an Australian breed or group of breeds of sheep, forming a significant part of the Merino group of breeds world-wide. Its origins lie in Merino sheep imported to Australia from South Africa in 1797. By about 1830 there were almost two million Merinos in the country.

== History ==
In 1790, Charles IV of Spain sent a gift of Merino sheep from the Escorial cavana to the government of the Dutch Republic. They did not thrive there, but did well in the Dutch Cape Colony, in what is now South Africa.

The origins of the Australian Merino lie in a shipment of twenty-six of these sheep bought in the Cape Colony in 1797 by Henry Waterhouse and William Kent; approximately half the flock survived the voyage to Australia. Some stock from this shipment was sold to Elizabeth and John Macarthur of Elizabeth Farm in Parramatta. By about 1830, there were almost two million Merinos in the country.

== Breeds, strains and lines ==
The original strain bred by the Macarthurs survives as the Camden Park or Macarthur Merino. The four principal breeds or strains that developed within the Australian Merino group were the Peppin, the Saxon, the South Australian and the Spanish. The Poll Merino or Australian Poll Merino is a recently created polled variant. Other strains recognised as breeds include the Booroola Merino, the Bungaree Merino, the Dohne Merino, the Fonthill Merino, the Tasmanian Merino (which derives from the Saxon); and the Trangie Fertility.

== Use ==
The Merino is reared for wool. Depending on the breed or bloodline, the sheep can yield wool of varying fineness, ranging from strong through medium, medium-fine, fine and superfine to ultrafine, which is among the finest of all wools.

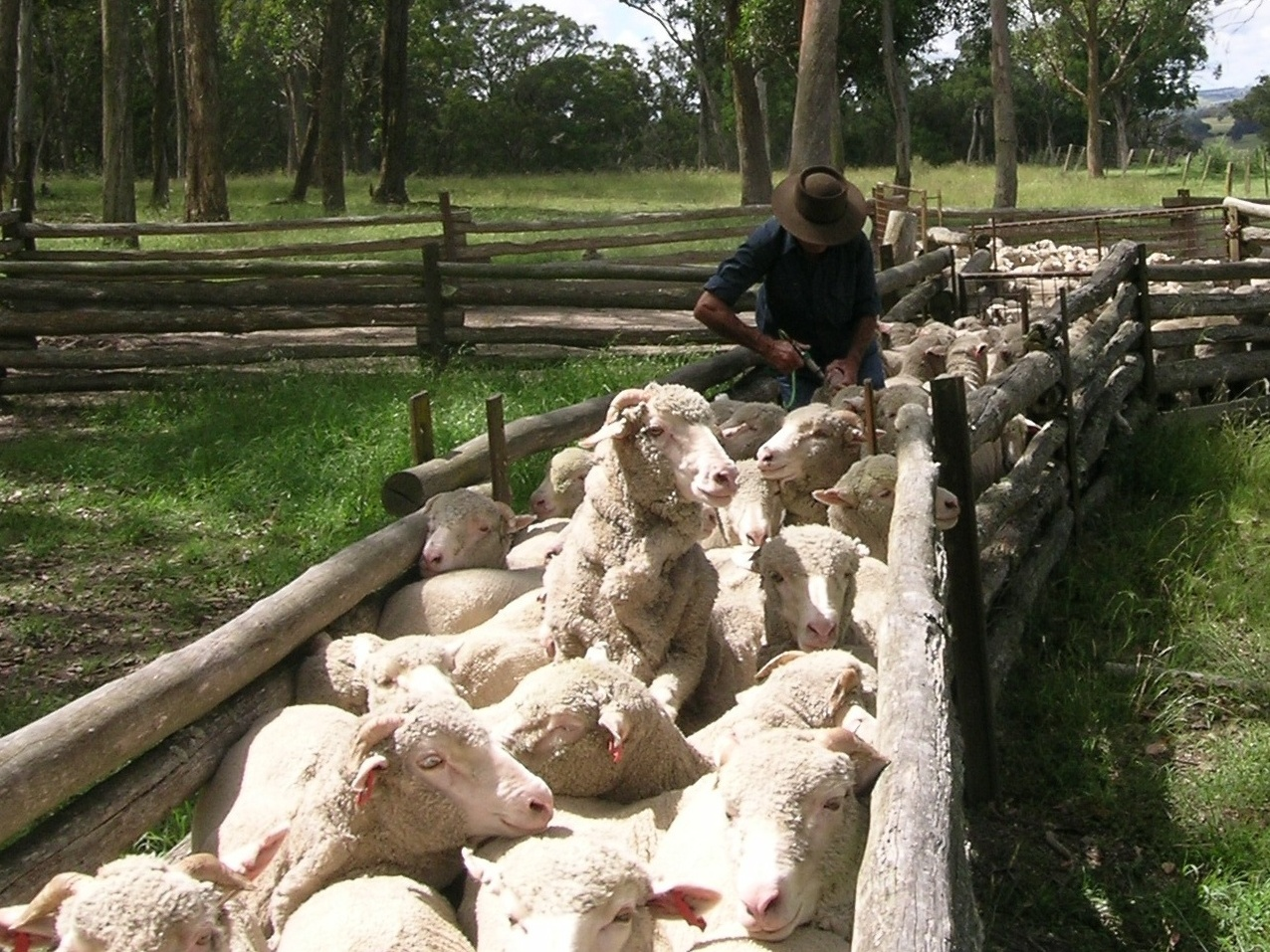
Hoggets being drenched near Walcha in New South Wales

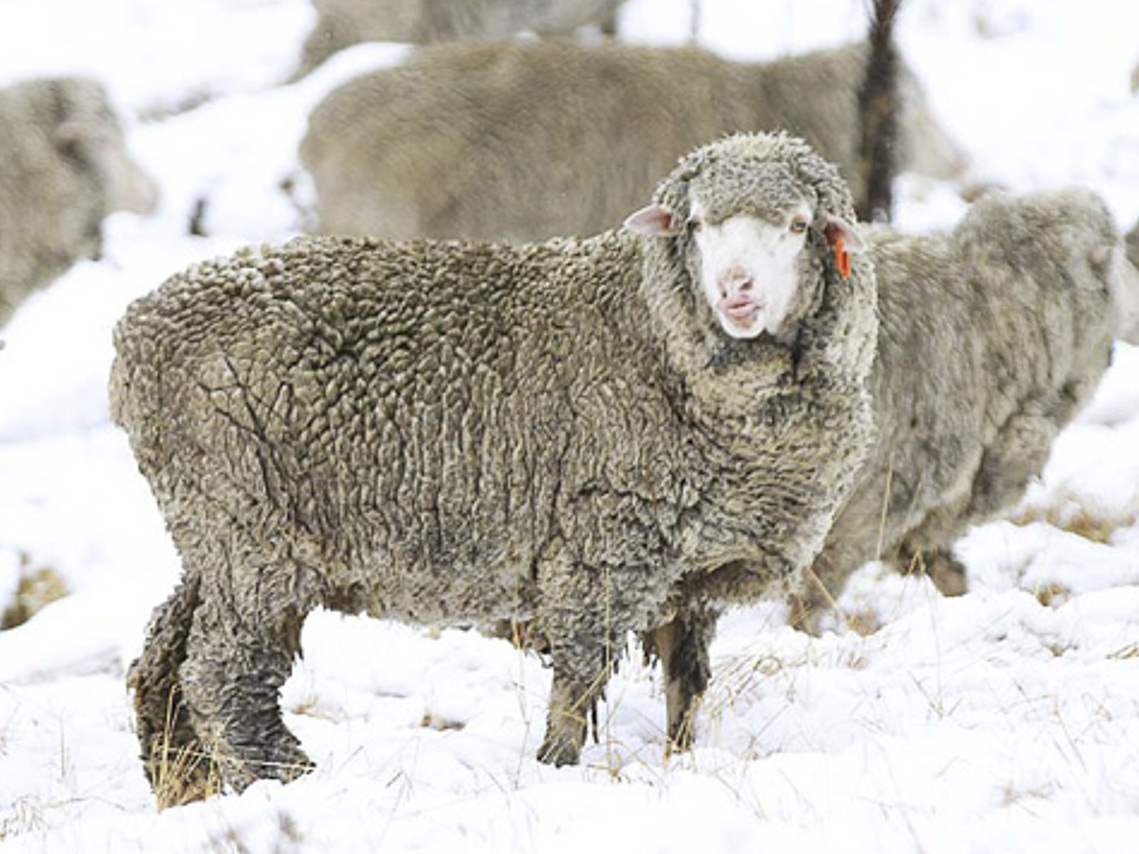
On the New England Tablelands
