= Poll Merino =

Breed of sheep

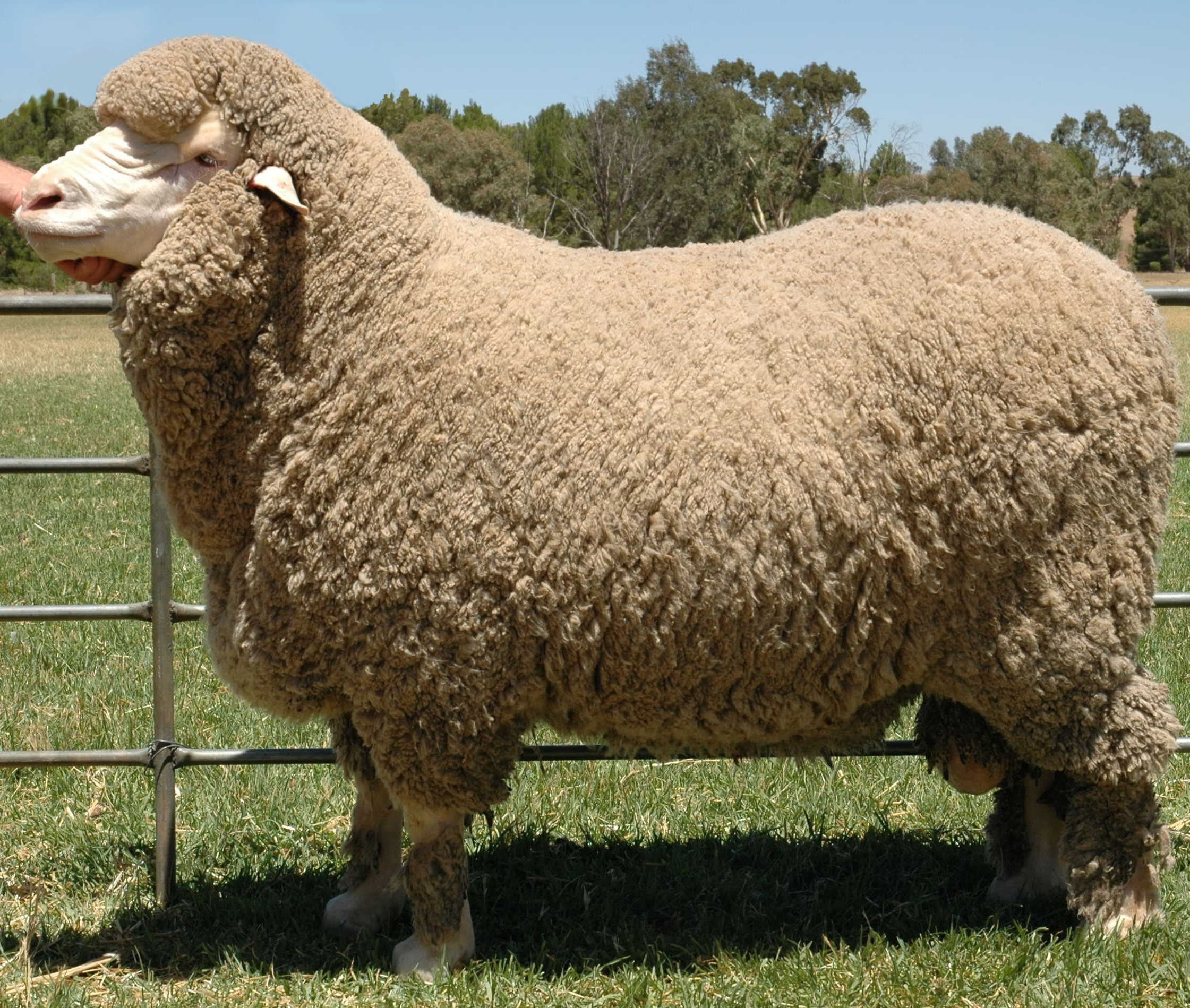
A Poll Merino ram

The Poll Merino is a subtype of the Australian Merino breed of domestic sheep, without horns, that was developed in Australia.

== Characteristics ==
These sheep are early maturing, large framed and relatively plain bodied, producing a fleece which is soft handling and of good colour thus retaining the attributes of the Merino. Polled Merinos are now found in the various strains of Merinos.

A single gene with three possible alleles controls horn inheritance in Australian Merinos.

Allele	Result	Comment
P	Poll	Dominant to p and P^{1}
P^{1}	Horns	Recessive to P, dominant to p
p	Horns in rams, scurs in ewes	Recessive to P^{1} and P

Poll Merino rams are not susceptible to poll strike (maggots behind the horns) which results from fighting and which can cause temporary infertility. They are also easier to crutch and shear, are less likely to become caught in fences or bushes and they are generally easier to handle. The wethers do not develop the stag horns that regular Merino wethers grow if they are not castrated early.

== History ==
In 1825 Alexander Riley was the first Australian breeder to obtain a poll ram with a view to establishing a poll Merino flock. The ram was imported by him from Germany, along with Saxon ewes. Boonoke, Bungaree, Uardry and Wanganella studs made specific mention of "poley" or poll rams for sale from the early 1880s. During the 1880s the first conscious attempt was made to breed the modern-type Poll Merinos by the Munros at Webollabolla, Moree, New South Wales. This stud is the oldest Poll Merino stud in Australia.

The Kirkby Poll Merino studs (Success and Reno) were started in Moree during 1932, Boonoke Poll in 1934 and Merryville Poll in 1938. The early Western Australian studs (Cranmore Park 1947, Belmore Park 1957) purchased Boonoke poll rams.

Otway Falkiner started the Boonoke Poll Stud using 13 "sports", which had no horns, from the Boonoke 1934 drop of nearly 9,000 rams. From this group of thirteen rams, eight were put over 400 Boonoke ewes the following year. The first offering of Poll Boonoke rams to the public was in 1937. Otway Falkiner’s contribution was acknowledged by registering Boonoke as Poll Flock No. 1, in the first separate section for Poll Merinos in the Australian Stud Merino Flock Register.

Many studs are now breeding Poll Merinos to cater for the increased demand for these easier-to-care-for sheep.

== See also ==
- Booroola Merino
- Peppin Merino
- Polled livestock
