= Dohne Merino =

Breed of sheep

The Dohne Merino (Dohne, El Dohne Merino) is a breed of domestic sheep from South Africa. The breed was started in the late 1930s by the South African Department of Agriculture. It was developed by interbreeding Peppin-style Merino ewes and German Mutton Merino rams. The Dohne Merino is a dual purpose breed providing meat and fine wool.

== Characteristics ==
At maturity, the Dohne Merino ram weighs 80 to 100 kg (180 to 220 lb) and the ewe will weight 50 to 65 kg (110 to 143 lb). At 100 days, both sexes will weigh 25 to 35 kg (55 to 77 lb). Yearly fleece production is 3.5 to 5.0 kg (7.7 to 11.0 lb) with an average diameter of 17 to 21 microns.
