= Coolalee =

Breed of sheep

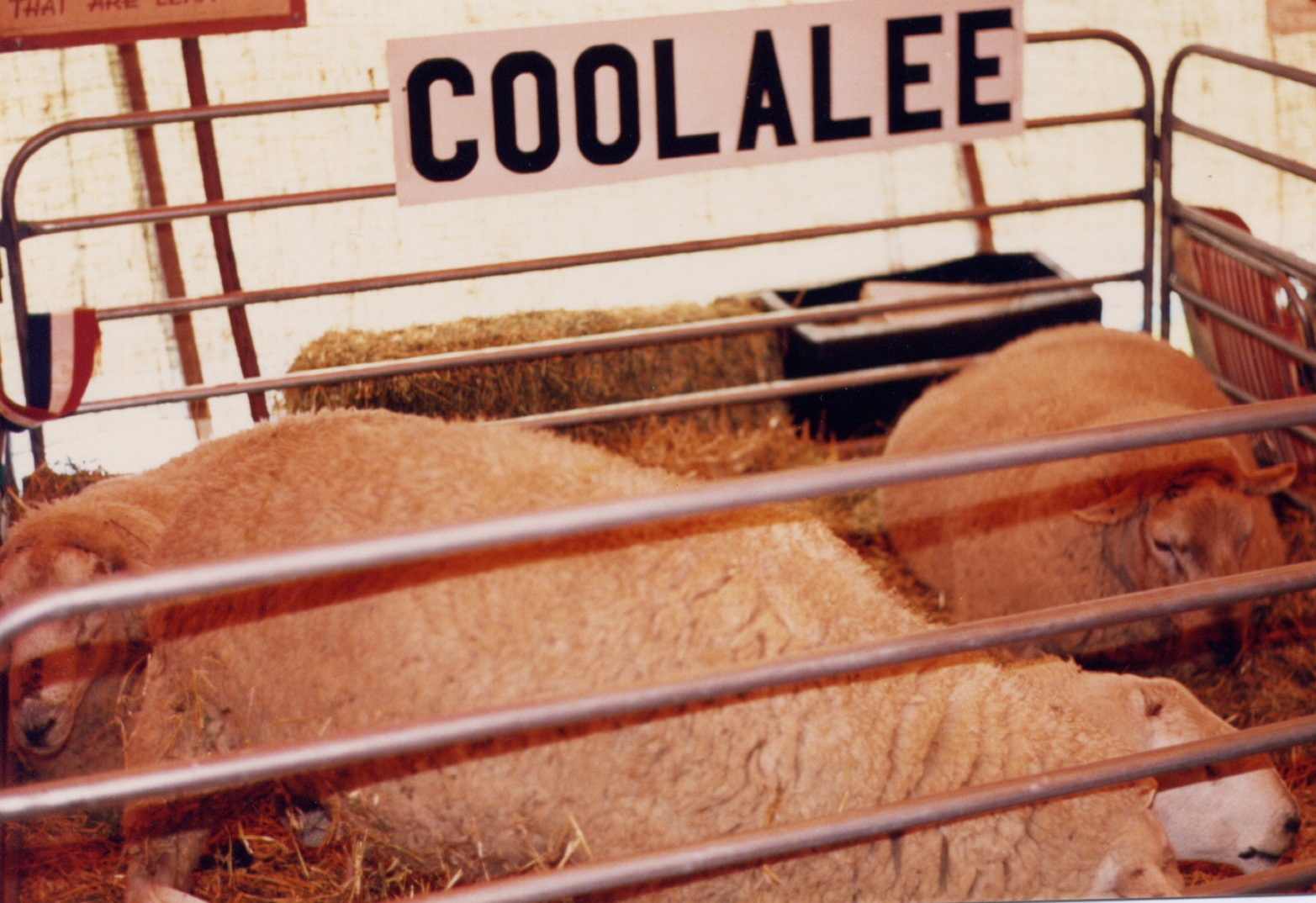
- Country of origin: Australia
- Use: Wool; meat
- Wool colour: White

The Coolalee is an Australian short wool, meat sheep breed, developed from an eight-year breeding program commenced in 1968. The breed resulted from the crossing of the Wiltshire Horn, Suffolk, Hampshire Down, Poll Dorset, Lincoln and English Leicester sheep breeds.

The first Coolalee rams became commercially available in 1983. These rams are used as terminal sires for prime lamb production.

Coolalee sheep have shown considerable promise in an independent central progeny testing system for prime lambs. The system is designed to identify outstanding meat sheep sires and their ability to sire elite lamb with a carcase weight of more than 22 kg and a fat score of 2–3. The testing also showed significant reductions in fat depth, which is an important consumer requirement, on first cross Coolalee lambs.
