= Booroola Merino =

Breed of sheep

The Booroola is a strain of Australian Merino sheep that has a high rate of multiple births. It was developed in the mid-20th century on a sheep station of the same name in southeastern New South Wales, from descendents of sheep imported to Sydney from India in the 1790s.

Booroola's prolificacy was studied extensively by New Zealand researchers, who provided one of the first examples of the practical application of gene mapping in sheep, by mapping the Booroola gene to chromosome 6.

== History ==
The Booroola Merino was started in Australia in the 1940s, by Jack and Dick Seears of "Booroola", a sheep station near the town of Cooma in the southeast of the state of New South Wales 300 km (190 mi) south-southwest of Sydney, using ewes from their Egelabra flock that frequently had multiple-births. The Seears family gave a quintuplet ram to the Australian federal governmental scientific research agency CSIRO in 1958, another in 1959 and a sextuplet ewe in 1960. In 1958, the CSIRO purchased 12 ewes (triplets or quadruplets) and a ewe that had given birth to triplets. When the Booroola flock was dispersed in 1965, the CSIRO purchased 91 mixed-age multiple-born ewes and moved their Booroola flock from the Deniliquin district 400 km (250 mi) west-northwest of Cooma in central-southern New South Wales to the Armidale district 400 km (250 mi) north of Sydney in the northeast of the state.

The Egelabra and Mumblebone strains of the Australian Merino, developed on two eponymous sheep stations near Warren in central New South Wales, can be traced to a flock established in the late 1830s–1840s on "Gamboola" station near Molong 200 km (120 mi) southeast of Warren and 300 km (190 mi) west-northwest of Sydney; this flock was derived from Samuel Marsden's flock that, like John Macarther's flock, was based on Spanish Royal Escurial Merino and African Cape sheep that Henry Waterhouse brought to Sydney from the Cape Colony (now part of South Africa) in 1797. Marsden's flock was also based on Bengali Garole sheep brought to the then-new English settlement of Sydney from Calcutta as a source of meat in the early 1790s. The highly-fertile Garole is the source of the gene that controls the Boorola's fertility.

== Notes ==
- Cottle, D.J. (1991). Australian Sheep and Wool Handbook. Melbourne, Australia: Inkata Press. pp. 20–23. ISBN 0-909605-60-2.
