= Peppin Merino =

Breed of sheep

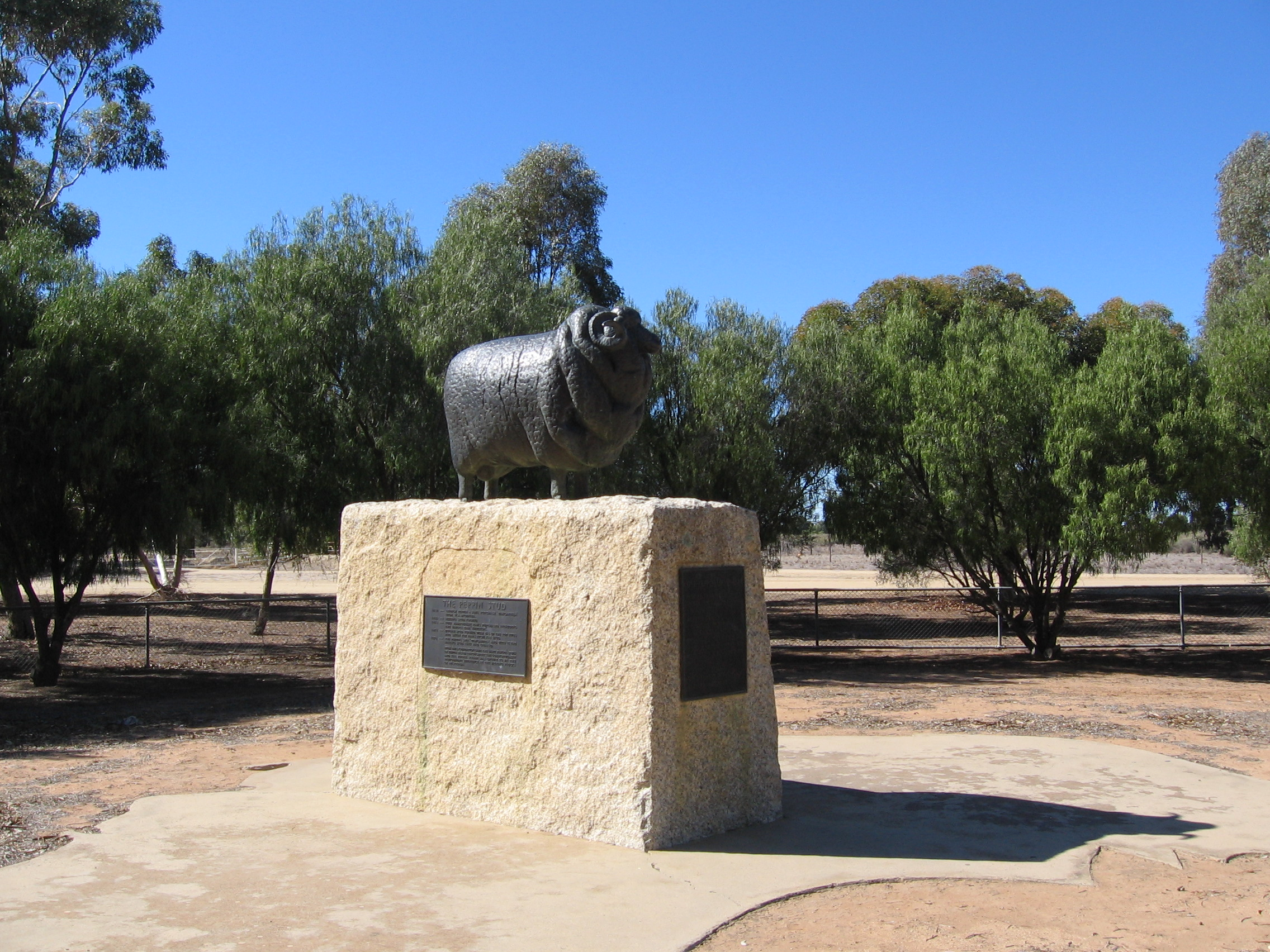
The Peppin Merino memorial at Wanganella, New South Wales

The Peppin Merino is a breed of Merino sheep raised for their wool, mostly in Australia. So important is the Peppin Merino that wool producers throughout Australia often classify their sheep simply as being either Peppin, or non-Peppin.

Peppin merino wool is in the 20 to 23 micron range. The Peppin is prevalent in the sheep flocks of Queensland, on the slopes and plains of New South Wales, through the north of Victoria and the mixed farming areas of South Australia and Western Australia. It can also be found in significant numbers in the higher rainfall areas of Victoria, Tasmania and New South Wales.

== History ==
In March 1858, the Peppin brothers, who had emigrated from Old Shute Farm, Dulverton, Somerset in England, purchased Wanganella Station, near Wanganella township in the Riverina district of New South Wales. The Peppins then selected 200 station-bred ewes that thrived under local conditions and purchased 100 Rambouillet-sired stud ewes from Nicholas Chadwick of Canally, New South Wales.

The Peppin brothers mainly used Saxon Merino (a few of the best Victorian rams) and Rambouillet Merino rams, importing four in 1860. One of these, Emperor, cut an 11.4 kg (5.1 kg clean) fleece. They also bought two sons of Old Grimes, a famous plain-bodied Vermont ram, but from then on they bred only from their own sheep. In 1871, Fred Peppin said,

"We were satisfied with the type of wool that the country would grow, instead of endeavoring to produce what the climate and soil continually fight against. Thus we developed all its good natural tendencies and after the flock had a character of its own, tried experiments on a small scale only, and in such a way that they could do no permanent injury, and abandoned then when they were found not to achieve the desired object."

They ran some Lincoln ewes, but their introduction into the flock is undocumented.

In 1874, the Peppin brothers, George and Frederick, formed a double stud (recorded ewe and ram pedigree), the foundation stock being selected by T. F. Cumming. They kept careful records of the yields of individual sheep, and breeding was methodically conducted. At the Deniliquin show in July 1878, Peppin & Sons won the society's, Goldsbrough's and the president's prizes for sheep. The next year, Wanganella sheep won first prize for the most valuable fleeces from six ewes at the Sydney International Exhibition.

George Peppin died in 1876, and in October 1878, Frederick Peppin sold Wanganella, South Boonoke and Long Plains with 28,168 sheep, 837 stud sheep, 200 cattle, 25 horses and 32,857 acres (132.97 km²) of freehold for £77,000 to Austin & Millear. North Boonoke station with 26,788 sheep, 290 cattle, 63 horses and 31,484 acres (127.41 km²) of freehold land was sold for £67,000 to F. S. Falkiner, Malcolm McKenzie and J. R. Ross in November 1878.

Falkiner bought out his partners in 1882, transformed the property and developed a stud with sheep bred from the original Peppin stock. When Franc Falkiner died in 1909, he had amassed in excess of 500,000 acres (2,000 km²) of Riverina grazing land and was running a quarter of a million Boonoke blood sheep.

In 1895, Austin and Millear dissolved their partnership, with Austin retaining Wanganella in the west and Millear taking the eastern half, which was renamed Wanganella Estate as was Millear's Merino Stud. In 1910, the Falkiner sons purchased Wanganella Estate and its stud flock. In 1958, the Peppin property was reunited when F S Falkiner & Sons purchased Wanganella from Austin.

The two studs created when Frederick Peppin sold Wanganella (Wanganella and Boonoke) continue today along with Boonoke poll started in 1934.
