= Corriedale =

New Zealand breed of sheep

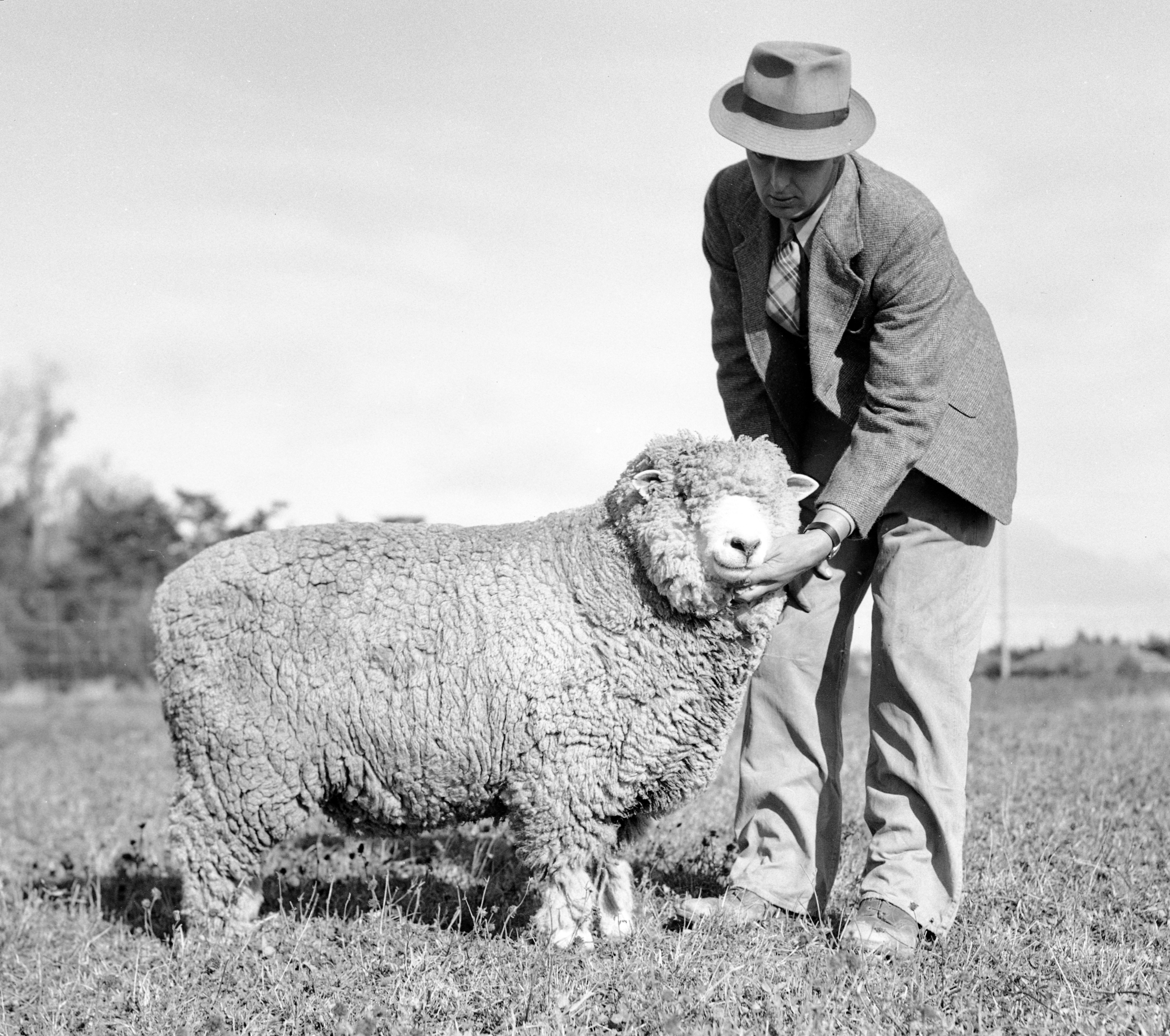
- Ram, Canterbury Agricultural College, winner of Best Corriedale Ram Hogget at the 1947 Christchurch Show

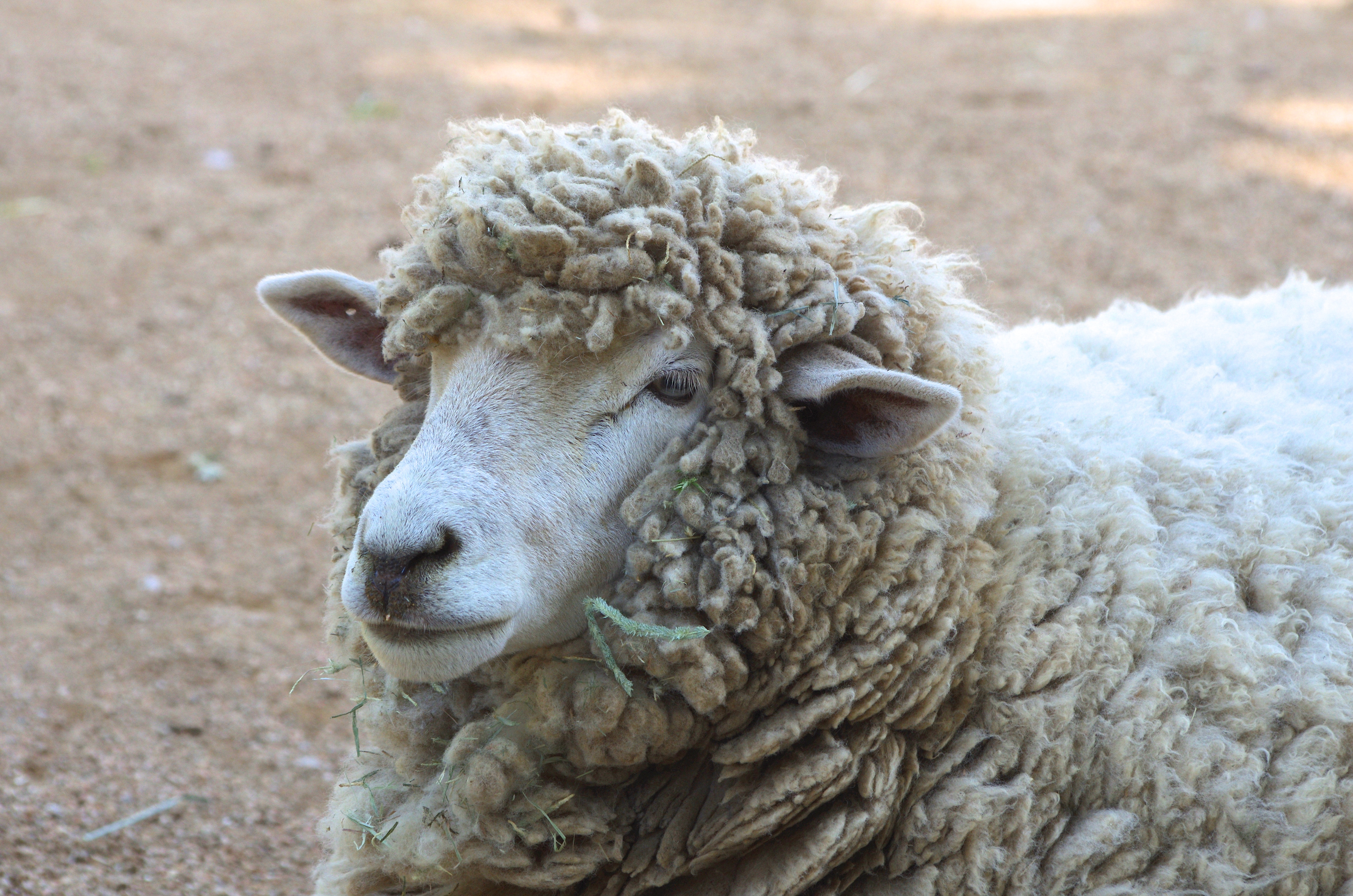
- In Oji Zoo, in Kobe, Japan
- Conservation status: FAO (2007): not at risk; DAD-IS (2021): not at risk
- Country of origin: New Zealand
- Distribution: 25 countries

Traits
- Weight: Male: 85–105 kg; Female: 65–75 kg
- Face colour: white
- Horn status: polled

The Corriedale is a New Zealand breed of sheep. It was bred from about 1882 in the South Island by James Little, who cross-bred Merino and Lincoln Longwool sheep. The breed was officially recognised in 1911. It has been exported to Australia and to many countries in Africa, Asia, Europe and North and South America. In 2021 it was reported from twenty-five countries, and the total population world-wide was estimated at just over 5 million.

== History ==
The Corriedale was developed in the latter part of the nineteenth century by cross-breeding Merino and Lincoln Longwool sheep, with the aim of producing sheep with grazing requirements intermediate between the lush lowlands which suited the British breeds and the sparse dry grazing preferred by the Merino.

The first to attempt this was James Little, who had come to New Zealand from the United Kingdom in 1863, and had previously tried to cross-breed Merinos with British Romney stock. At the Corriedale estate in North Otago, where he was manager, he then attempted to produce a Lincoln-Merino cross, but the results were unsatisfactory. At about the same time William Davidson, manager of The Levels, an estate in South Canterbury, began similar work using Lincoln rams on medium-wool Merino ewes; the resulting sheep became the foundation stock for the Corriedale breed.

In the following decade two Australian breeders – Corbett of Victoria in 1882, and MacKinnon in Tasmania in 1888 – also did work with the same aim. In both Australia and New Zealand there was some admixture of Romney (for better conformation) and Border Leicester (for better rate of growth). Stock from The Levels was imported to Australia from 1911.

In New Zealand the Corriedale could from 1903 be registered as an "Inbred Half-Bred" in an appendix to the flock-book of the New Zealand Sheepbreeders' Association. A breed association was formed in 1910, and in 1911 the name "Corriedale" was officially recognised; the first flock-book for the breed was published in 1924. In Australia a flock-book was established in 1922.

Within a few years the Corriedale was exported to a number of countries, and breeders' associations were established many of them, including some European and South American countries, South Africa and the United States of America. It became one of the most numerous sheep breeds world-wide. In Uruguay in 1970 the population was estimated at 8.5 million, or about half the national herd. In 2021 Uruguay reported about 2.75 million head, while Chile and Peru each reported well over a million. In 2016 the number in New Zealand was estimated to be over 3 million. Polwarth and Corriedale are the principal sheep breeds reared on the Falkland Islands.

The Broomfield Corriedale was selectively bred from the original Corriedale stock for greater resistance to foot-rot. Among the breeds that derive in part from the Corriedale are: the Borderdale of New Zealand (Corriedale x Border Leicester); the China Semi-Finewool (Corriedale x Mongolian); the Corino of Argentina (Corriedale x Merino); the Cormo of Tasmania (Corriedale x Tasmanian Merino); the Cormo Argentino, developed in Argentina from the Cormo; the Australian Gromark (Corriedale x Border Leicester); the Linchuan of Jiangxi Province, China (Corriedale/Romney x local finewools); the Australian Siromeat; the American Targhee; the Warhill of Arizona, USA, and the Argentinian Junin derived from it.

Corriedale and Ryeland were used to transmit the polled gene in the development of the Australian Poll Dorset.

A number of breeds have "Corriedale" or "Koridel" in the breed name, but are not directly derived from the original stock; rather, they have been developed using a similar pattern of cross-breeding. Among these are the Askanian Corriedale of Ukraine, cross-bred from British longwool sheep and local Askanian stock; the Bond or Commercial Corriedale, bred in Australia from about 1909; the Canadian Corriedale; the Kazakh Corriedale, bred in Kazakhstan from the Kazakh Finewool and British longwool stock; The Armenian Koridel; the North Caucasus Mutton-Wool, derived from crosses between the Stavropol and the Lincoln Longwool; the Polish Corriedale; the Poznań Corriedale; the Soviet Mutton-Wool or Mountain Koridel; and the Tyan Shan.

== Characteristics ==
The Corriedale is of medium to large size; grown ewes weigh some 65–75 kg, full-grown rams 85–105 kg. It is polled, white-woolled and white-faced, with dark hooves and dark skin on the nostrils. Ewes have good maternal qualities but are not highly prolific – the twinning rate is in the range 5%–25%.

== Use ==
It is a dual-purpose breed, reared both for wool and for mutton.

Ewe fleeces weigh some 5–7 kg, with a staple length of 150–180 mm and a fibre diameter of 25–32 μm, equivalent to a Bradford count of 56/50s. The wool is used to make blankets, rugs, military uniforms, knitting wools, tweeds and worsteds.
