= Polypay =

Breed of sheep

The Polypay sheep breed is a white, medium-sized (65 kg), polled sheep which was developed in the 1960s at the U.S. Sheep Experiment Station in Dubois, Idaho. In general, Polypay sheep are noted for being a highly prolific maternal dual-purpose (meat and wool) breed. It produces yearly about 4.2 kg of wool and is weaned at 120 days.

== History ==
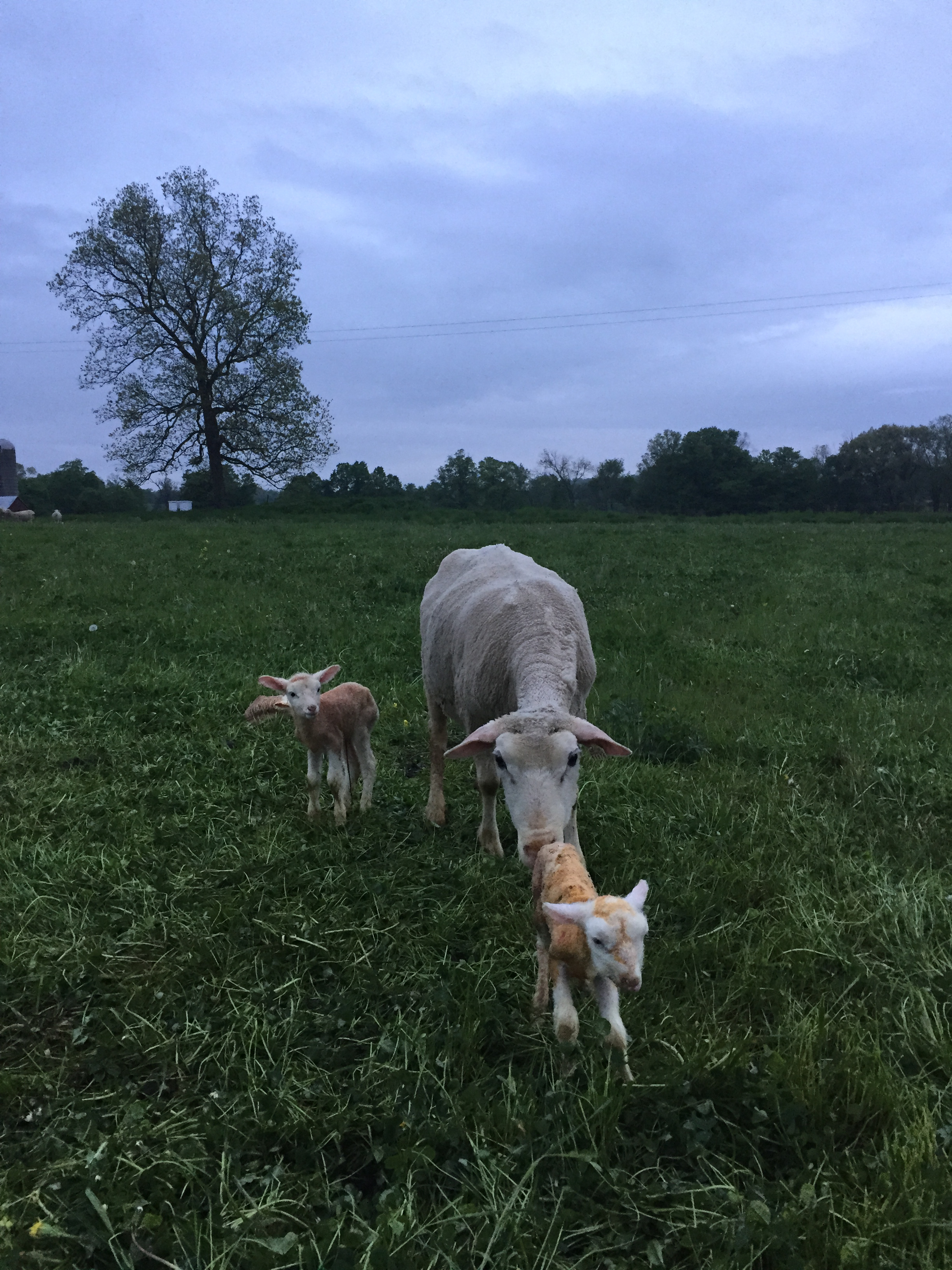
A Polypay ewe tends to her newly born triplets.

Dr. Clarence V. Hulet, at the U.S. Sheep Experiment Station in Dubois, Idaho, had five main goals when creating the new breed.

- High lifetime prolificacy
- Large lamb crop at one year of age
- Ability to lamb more frequently than once per year
- Rapid growth rate of lambs
- Desirable carcass quality

The original breeding stock were taken from the Finnsheep for their high prolificacy, early puberty and short gestation, Dorset for their superior mothering ability, carcass quality, early puberty and long breeding season, Targhee for their large body size, long breeding season and quality fleeces, and Rambouillet for their adaptability, hardiness, productivity and quality fleeces. In 1968, Hulet performed the first cross breedings generating Finnsheep x Rambouillet (F x R) and Dorset x Targhee (D x T) lambs, which were born in 1969. The first 4-breed composites (F x R x D x T) were made in 1970. After seeing the potential and enthusiasm for the new breed, Hulet coined the name for the breed in 1975. The Polypay name was created from poly, meaning multiple, and pay, meaning return on investment. Pay also means the ability the breed has to contribute more than two paying "crops" each year, i.e. two lamb crops and one wool crop. The American Polypay Association was then later formed in 1980.

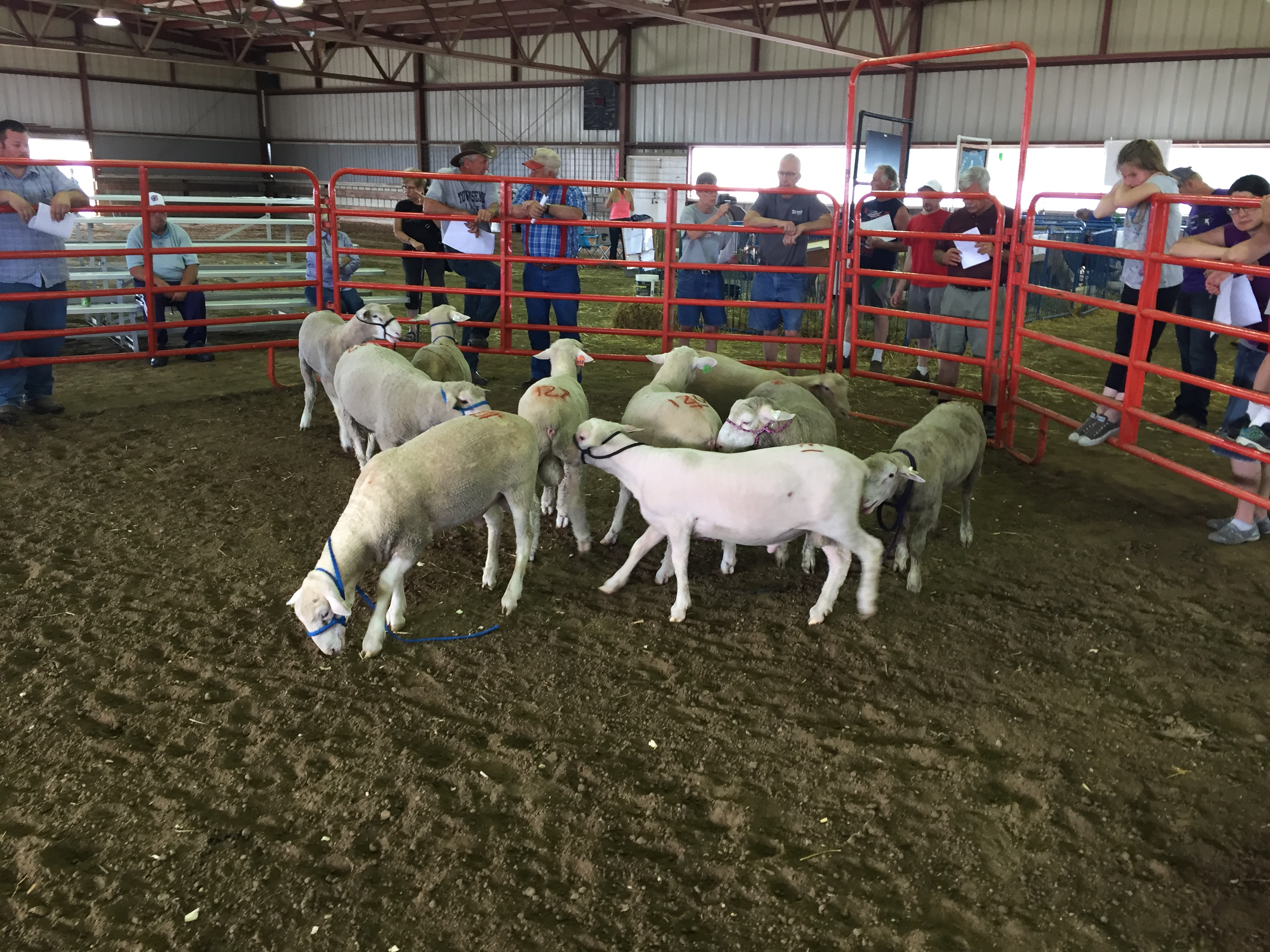
Ram lambs at the 2017 APSA National Sale.

The community of Polypay breeders is active and continues to grow to develop the breed. Currently, there are about 100 members of the American Polypay Association and there are typically about 1,500 animals registered each year. In 1987, the National Sheep Improvement Program (NSIP) was initiated and included the Polypay breed. Through the efforts of the breeders enrolled in the program, breeders have been able to significantly enhance the breed characteristics. There are currently 41 breeders and 1,244 animals were added to the NSIP in 2016. There are nearly 14,000 animals in the registry. Each year there are national sales that highlight the breed in Sedalia, MO, Spencer, IA and Wooster, OH. These sales incorporate traditional conformational characteristics as well as estimated breeding values (EBVs) generated through the NSIP.

== Breed characteristics ==
To be registered as a Polypay, an animal must be the offspring of registered parents, of parents each containing 1/4 Rambouillet, 1/4 Targhee, 1/4 Dorset, and 1/4 Finnsheep blood, or of a registered sire and some other combination of foundation breeding, which would produce at least a 15/16 Polypay offspring. Furthermore, the animal must:

1. Be free of gross anatomical or physical defects (Entropion eyes, etc)
2. Not be subject to wool blindness
3. Have a smooth body from neck folds
4. Have no color in fleece and less than 10% color (black or brown) in the hairy parts of the head and legs.
5. No extreme britchiness or extreme coarseness of wool.
6. Be polled. No scurs in ewes. Scurs in rams are undesirable and should be strongly discriminated against.
7. Incisor teeth must touch the dental pad.

In general, Polypay ewes are able to lamb at 1 year of age, wean twins, and mature ewes will weigh between 150 and 200 lbs. Mature Polypay rams will weigh between 240 and 300 lbs. All animals entered in a show or sale should be a twin or better and all ewes shown in a Yearling Ewe Class must have already lambed. Although Polypays are a general purpose breed, they are also known as a maternal breed because of their prolificacy, ability to breed aseasonally, early fertility, high milk production, and good mothering. In cross-breeding programs with a meat-type terminal sire, offspring exhibit hybrid vigor for traits such as growth rate and carcass quality.

== See also ==
- List of sheep breeds
- Sheep shearing
- Wool
