= Comeback sheep =

Breed of sheep

The Comeback is a type of domestic sheep originating in Australia. This type of sheep results from crossbreds produced by British Longwool sheep and Merinos being mated back to Merinos. This cross is made to achieve a finer, better style of wool. Comeback style wool is also produced by Bond, Cormo and Polwarth sheep and they may prove easier to breed than Comebacks. The Comeback sheep are raised for meat and their fine wool.

== Characteristics ==
The staple length of the bulky wool is 11 cm (4.3 in) with an average diameter of 21 to 25 microns.

The Comeback is well adapted to high rainfall districts in Australia. Though they are similar to Merino, this breed does not have neck folds. Both sexes are either horned or polled (hornless). The average weight of mature rams is 90 kg (200 lb) and of ewes is 60 kg (130 lb). At birth, ewes and rams both weigh 4.5 kg (9.9 lb) on average.

== Production ==
The usual method of producing Comeback Sheep is first to mate a longwool ram with a Merino ewe. When the female progeny are sufficiently mature, they are mated to a Merino ram, and this produces the Comeback Sheep. However, although these hybrid sheep may be superior to their true bred ancestors, they are unsuitable for mating to each other. If a Merino ram is used the offspring will have fine wool but probably a smaller frame. Crossing the Comeback Sheep with a longwool breed, will produce progeny that is three-quarter bred. An alternative to this tricky situation may be to choose a Polwarth Sheep instead of a Comeback Sheep as they both have a similar type of wool.
