= North Country Cheviot =

Sheep breed

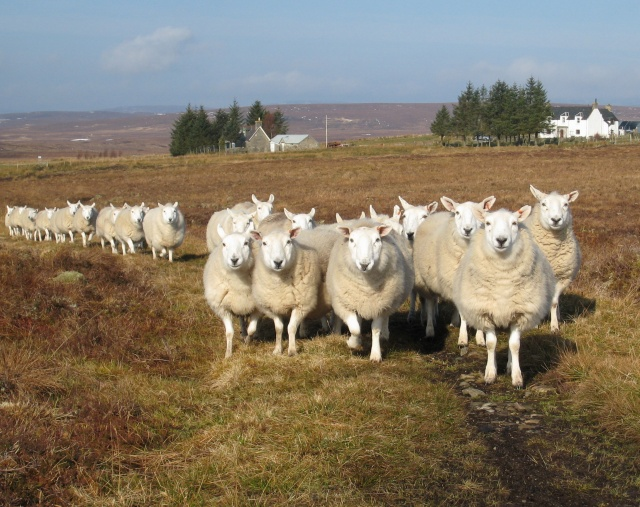
North Country Cheviots

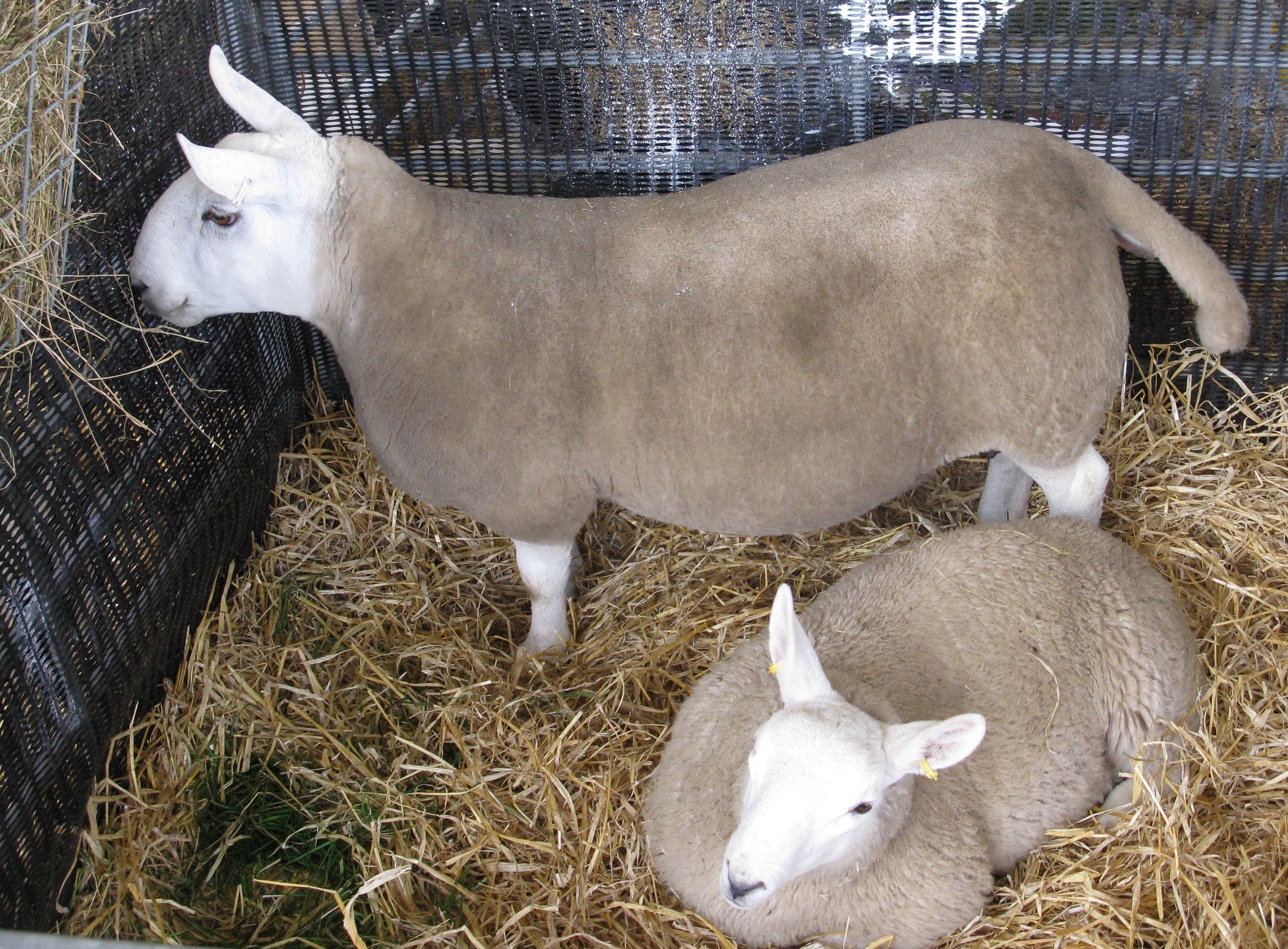
North Country Cheviot ewe and lamb

The North Country Cheviot is a breed of sheep, raised mainly for meat production. It is a variant of the Cheviot sheep that branched off from them in northern Scotland.

== History ==
In 1791, John Sinclair brought ewes from the Cheviot Hills near the English border to the counties of Caithness and Sutherland in north Scotland. He named these sheep "Cheviots" after the hill area they originated. The Cheviot sheep remained prominent on the Anglo-Scottish border regions, the Scottish Blackface became a prominent breed in mid-Scotland, and the sheep taken to northern Scotland would become the North Country Cheviots. Border Leicesters and Lincoln Longwools may have interbred with the North Country Cheviot line at some point. The result was a larger sheep that had a longer fleece, and one that matured earlier, compared to southern Cheviots. The North Country grows to about twice the size of its southern relative.

In 1912, Caithness and Sutherland breeders formed the North Country Sheep Breeders Association to manage shows and sales. In 1945, the organization changed its name to the existing North Country Cheviot Sheep Society, which manages registration, exporting, promotion, and breed improvement.

== Characteristics ==
North Country Cheviots are considered a large breed of sheep. Their head and legs are covered with white, short hair. They have a long roman nose and are polled. The nostrils and eyes are typically outlined with black.

They are a hardy, strong willed, independent breed of sheep that do well in harsh climates and on rough pastures. They lamb easily with excellent mothering instincts. Their offspring are vigorous at birth and have high survival rates, although they only have an average rate of gain they make up for it in the quality and yield of their carcass. North Country Cheviots can be used for crossbreeding both through the dam and sire. When not taken for meat, the breed has a long productive lifespan compared to other breeds.

Rams weigh from 100-120kg, ewes weigh from 55-80kg, and their fleece weighs 2–2.3kg.
