= Columbia sheep =

Breed of sheep

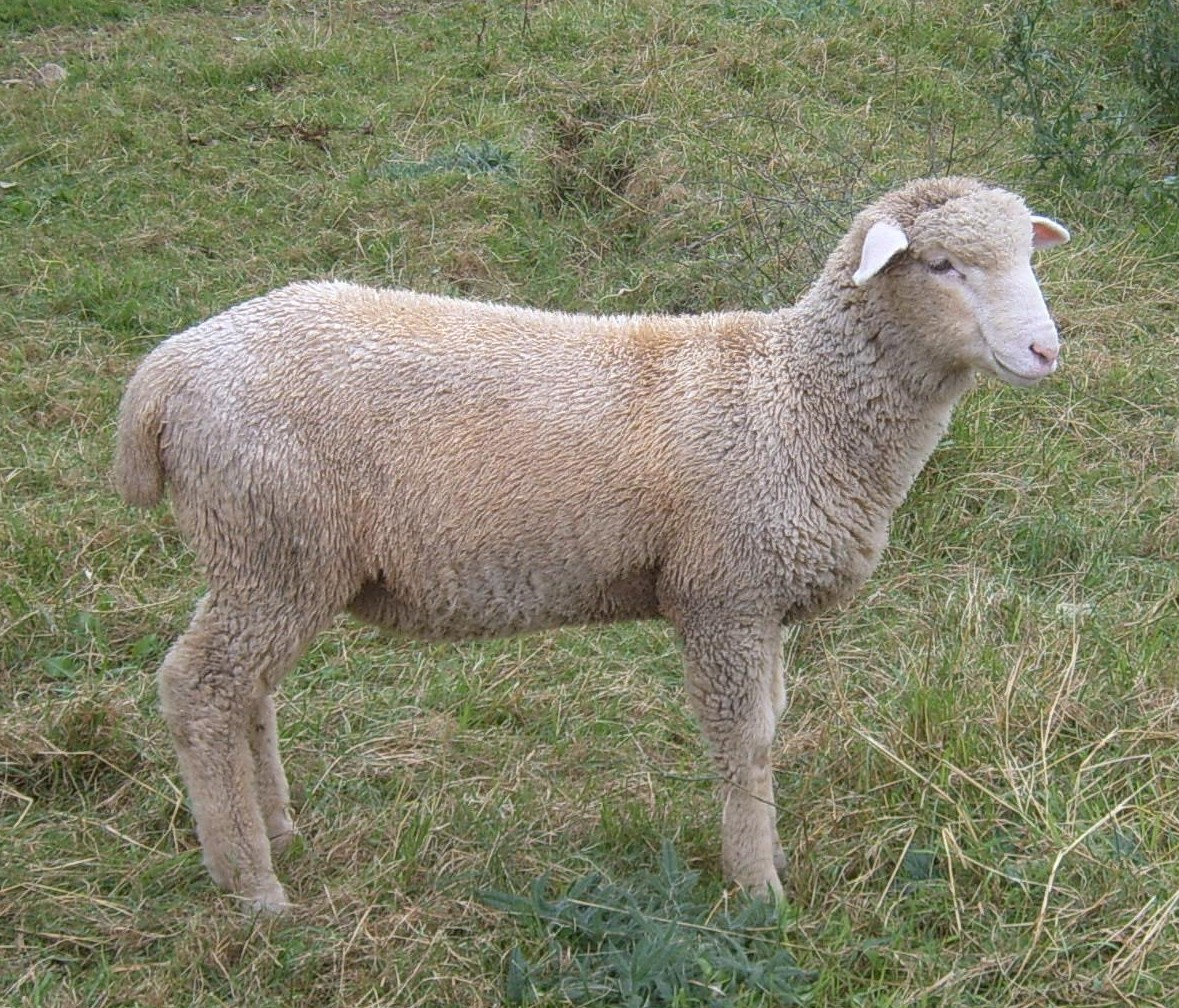
A Columbia ewe lamb

The Columbia is one of the first breeds of sheep developed in the United States. The product of USDA and university research, it was intended to be an improved breed adapted for the Western ranges of the country (where the majority of sheep raising takes place).

Beginning in 1912 in Laramie, Wyoming, Lincoln rams were crossed with Rambouillet ewes. In 1918, the foundation flock was moved to the U.S. Sheep Experiment Station near Dubois, Idaho, for further refinement. Today's Columbia is a popular breed, with heavy, white fleeces and good growth characteristics. It is one of the larger breeds, and is often used for cross breeding in commercial western flocks.

== Characteristics ==
Adult rams weigh between 275 and 400 lb (125 and 181 kg), while females weigh between 175 and 300 lb (79 and 136 kg). An average fleece from a ewe weighs from 10 to 16 lb (4.5 to 7.3 kg), with a yield of 45 to 55%. The staple length of the wool ranges from 3.5 to 5 in (8.9 to 12.7 cm). The wool is classified as medium wool with a spin count of 50s to 60s. The wool varies from 31.0 to 24.0 microns.
