= Polwarth =

Polwarth may refer to:

- Polwarth (sheep), a breed of sheep
- Polwarth, Edinburgh
- Polwarth, Scottish Borders
- Patrick Hume of Polwarth, makar in the court of James VI of Scotland
- Electoral district of Polwarth in the Parliament of Victoria, Australia
- County of Polwarth, a county of Victoria, Australia.
