= Acmaeodera alpina =

Scientific classification
- Kingdom: Animalia
- Phylum: Arthropoda
- Clade: Pancrustacea
- Class: Insecta
- Order: Coleoptera
- Suborder: Polyphaga
- Infraorder: Elateriformia
- Family: Buprestidae
- Genus: Acmaeodera
- Species: A. alpina

Binomial name
- Acmaeodera alpina Barr, 1972

Species of beetle

Acmaeodera alpina is a species of metallic wood-boring beetle in the family Buprestidae. It is found in North America, specifically in the western United States. Its adult host is Leptodactylon pungens. This species is more often collected and found on granite and bare soil than on flowers.
