= Targhee =

Targhee may refer to:

- Targhee National Forest, now the Caribou-Targhee National Forest a federally protected woodland in Idaho and Wyoming, United States
- Targhee sheep, a domestic breed developed within and named for the forest
- Grand Targhee Resort, a ski resort in Alta, Wyoming, within and named for the forest
