= Targhee sheep =

American breed of sheep

Targhee
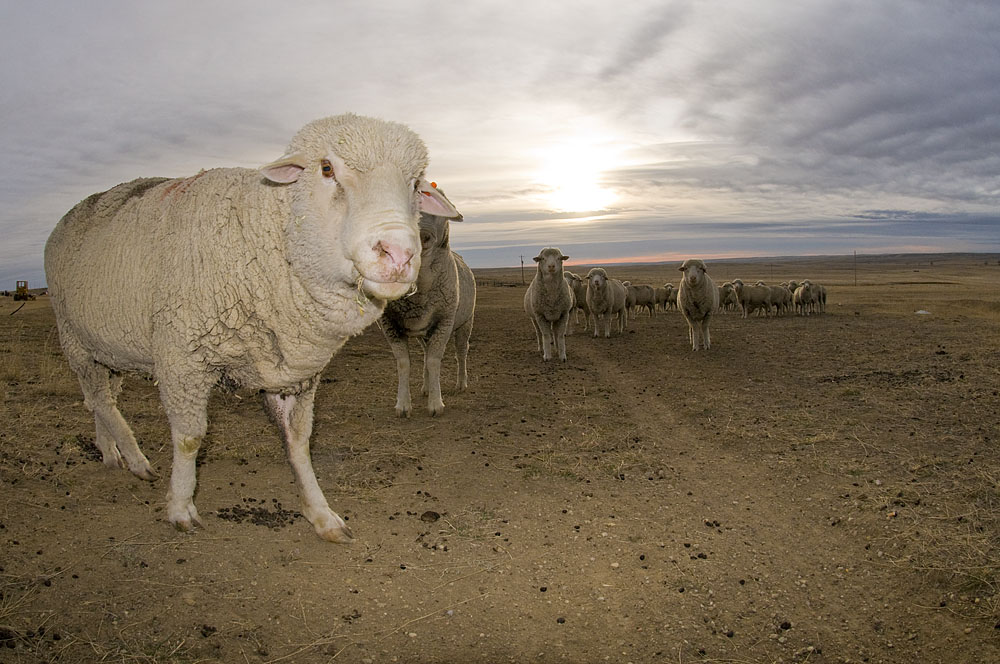
- Country of origin: United States
- Standard: Targhee Sheep Association

Traits
- Wool color: white

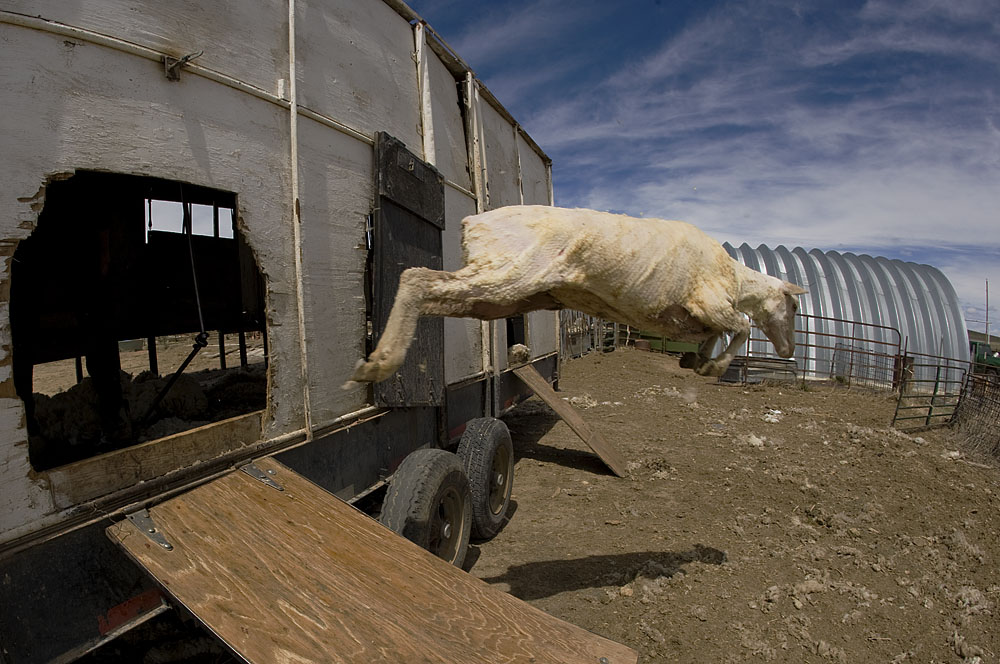
Leaping out after shearing in Wyoming

The Targhee is an American breed of domestic sheep. It was developed in the early twentieth century at the U.S. Sheep Experiment Station of the Agricultural Research Service of the United States Department of Agriculture at Dubois, Idaho, and is named after the Targhee National Forest which surrounds it. It is a dual-purpose breed, with heavy, medium-quality wool and good meat production characteristics. It is hardy and well-suited to the ranges of the West where it was developed. It is kept mainly in Montana, Wyoming and South Dakota, and is reared primarily for wool.

== History ==
The Targhee is named after the Targhee National Forest, which surrounds the U.S. Sheep Experiment Station in Idaho. Their ancestors were Rambouillet, Corriedale, and Lincoln sheep. Development of this breed for the Western ranges of the U.S. began as early as 1900. The flock book was closed in 1966, meaning that only the offspring of registered Targhees could be registered).

== Characteristics ==
Mature body weight in the rams is 200 lb (90 kg) to 300 lb (135 kg), with the ewes weighing slightly less at 125 lb (56 kg) to 200 lb (90 kg). Each ewe will average a 10 lb (4.5 kg) to 14 lb (6.3 kg) fleece; it has a fibre diameter of 21 to 25 micrometers and a spinning count of 64 to 58. The staple length of the fleece will be 3 inches (7.5 cm) to 5 inches (11 cm) with a yield of 50% to 55%.
