= Ryeland =

Breed of sheep

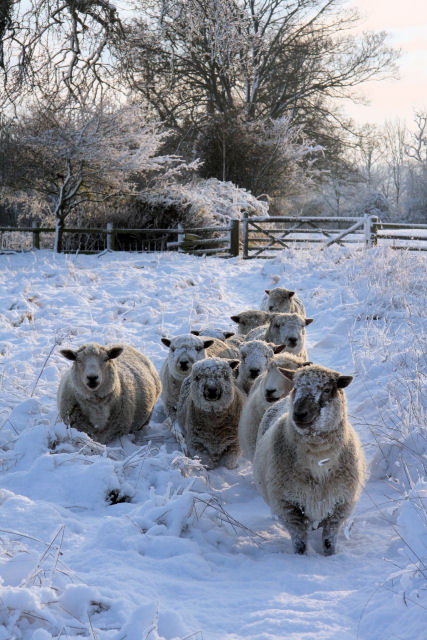
- Country of origin: United Kingdom
- Wool colour: White

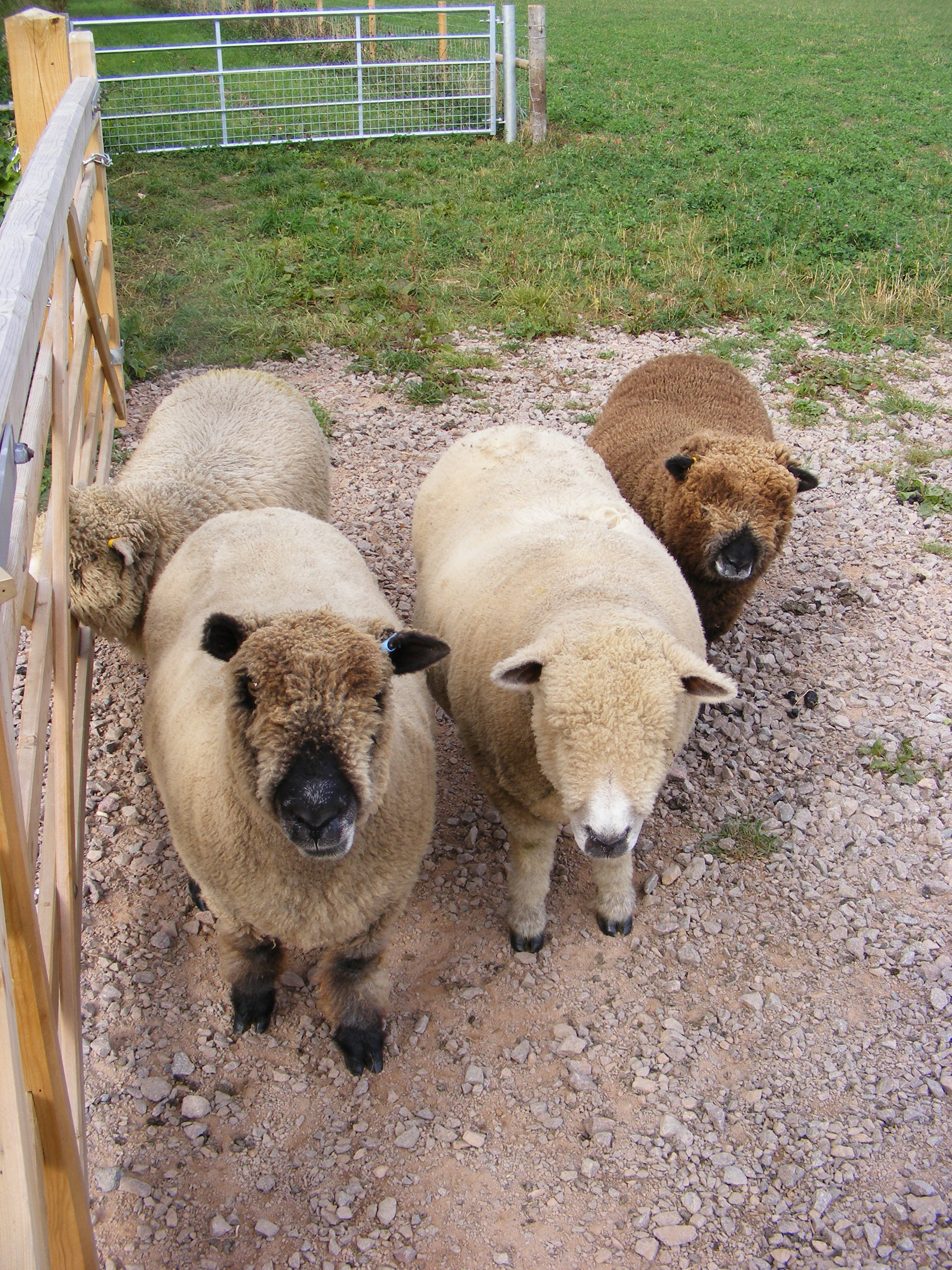
Ryeland sheep

The Ryeland is one of the oldest English sheep breeds going back seven centuries when the monks of Leominster in Herefordshire bred sheep and grazed them on the rye pastures, giving them their name. It was introduced into Australia in 1919 and are classified as an endangered breed by the Rare Breeds Trust of Australia and also are one of the nine heritage breeds that were the foundation of the sheep and wool industry in Australia. The Ryeland was one of the breeds used to introduce the poll gene (no horns) to the Dorset breed in the development of the Poll Dorset. This breed is raised primarily for meat.

== Breed characteristics ==
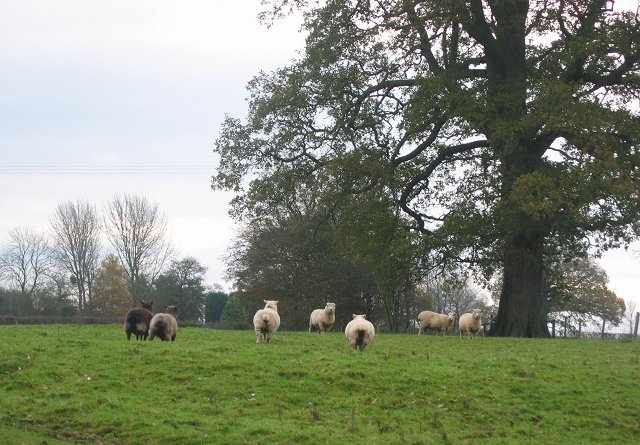
Ryeland Sheep near Ashford Carbonell, Shropshire, Great Britain

Ryelands are docile with high fertility. Due to their blocky build they are easy on fences compared to many breeds. They are ideal sheep for small properties. Ryelands are also 'good -doers' – William Youatt wrote that Ryelands "endure privation of food better than any other breed" and Sir Joseph Banks wrote "Ryelands deserve a niche in the temple of famine".

Ryelands have a smaller head than most terminal sires which makes them a good choice for maiden or Merino ewes but they have a fast growth rate and early maturity. In Australia the wool is always white and free of kemp.

A coloured gene does occur in Great Britain but appears to be unknown in Australia. The hooves are black and they are said to have good resistance to footrot. Naturally hornless, the Ryeland was the major breed used in the development of the poll gene in the Poll Dorset in Australia.

The wool resists felting. The staple length is generally 8 to 10 cm (3.1 to 3.9 in), with a fibre diameter of 25 to 28 microns. The fleece on average weighs 2 to 3 kg (4.4 to 6.6 lb).

== Queen Elizabeth I's favourite stockings ==
They were considered to have the finest wool of all British breeds of the time. Queen Elizabeth I was given 'Lemster' wool stockings and liked them so much that from then on she insisted only on 'Lemster' Ryeland wool. An Elizabethan observer wrote that 'among short-wools, Ryeland has pre-eminence with Leominster as the centre of its trade'.

The Ryeland is featured in David Low's book The Breeds of the Domestic Animals of the British Islands, published 1841 and a famous pioneering work illustrating the forerunners of all of the days' most important breeds of horses, cows, sheep and pigs. David Low was a professor of agriculture at the University of Edinburgh and was concerned that the relatively simple concepts of matching a breed to its environment while improving its productivity were not understood by the majority of farmers or breeders. With the help of a government grant from Earl Spencer, Low set up the agricultural museum in Edinburgh and commissioned William Shiels of the Royal Scottish Academy to produce paintings of all the breeds of economic significance in Great Britain at that time.
