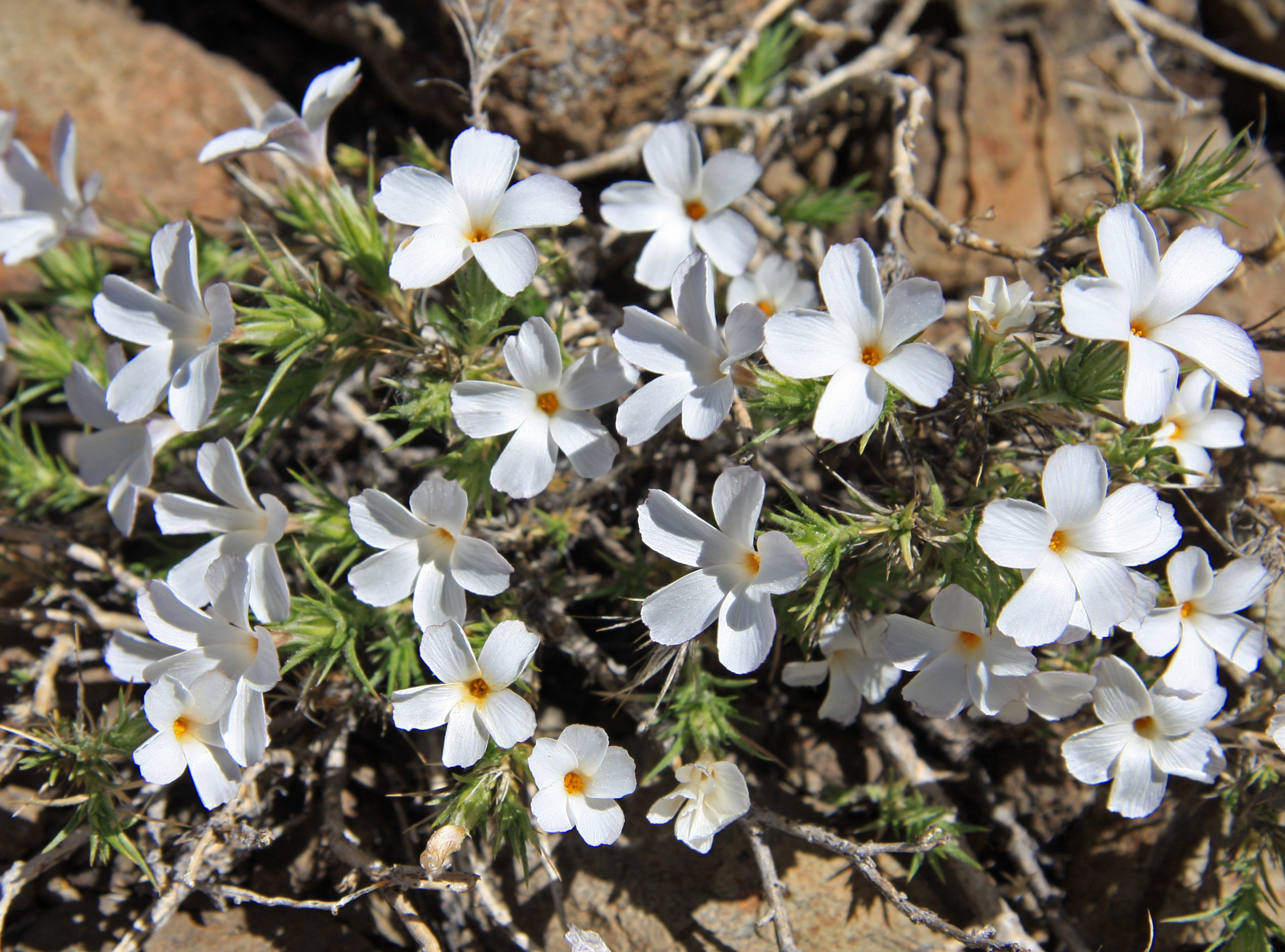

Conservation status
- Secure (NatureServe)

Scientific classification
- Kingdom: Plantae
- Clade: Embryophytes
- Clade: Tracheophytes
- Clade: Spermatophytes
- Clade: Angiosperms
- Clade: Eudicots
- Clade: Asterids
- Order: Ericales
- Family: Polemoniaceae
- Genus: Linanthus
- Species: L. pungens

Binomial name
- Linanthus pungens (Torr.) J.M.Porter & L.A.Johnson

Synonyms
- List: Aegochloa torreyi; Batanthes pungens; Cantua pungens; Cantua pungens var. hookeri; Cantua pungens var. squarrosa; Gilia hallii; Gilia hookeri; Gilia lilacina; Gilia pungens; Gilia pungens var. devestita; Gilia pungens subsp. eupungens; Gilia pungens subsp. hallii; Gilia pungens var. hallii; Gilia pungens var. hookeri; Gilia pungens subsp. pulchriflora; Gilia pungens var. squarrosa; Gilia pungens var. tenuiloba; Gilia tenuiloba; Leptodactylon brevifolium; Leptodactylon hallii; Leptodactylon hallii f. subflavidum; Leptodactylon hazeliae; Leptodactylon hookeri; Leptodactylon lilacinum; Leptodactylon lilacinum f. pulchriflorum; Leptodactylon lilacinum f. shastense; Leptodactylon pungens; Leptodactylon pungens subsp. brevifolium; Leptodactylon pungens var. brevifolium; Leptodactylon pungens subsp. eupungens; Leptodactylon pungens var. eupungens; Leptodactylon pungens subsp. hallii; Leptodactylon pungens var. hallii; Leptodactylon pungens subsp. hazeliae; Leptodactylon pungens f. hazeliae; Leptodactylon pungens subsp. hookeri; Leptodactylon pungens var. hookeri; Leptodactylon pungens var. hookeri; Leptodactylon pungens subsp. pulchriflorum; Leptodactylon pungens var. shastense; Leptodactylon pungens subsp. squarrosum; Leptodactylon pungens var. squarrosum; Leptodactylon pungens var. subflavidum; Leptodactylon pungens var. tenuilobum; Leptodactylon tenuilobum; Linanthus pungens var. pulchriflorus; Navarretia pungens; Phlox hookeri

= Linanthus pungens =

Species of flowering plant

Linanthus pungens (syn. Leptodactylon pungens) is a species of flowering plant in the phlox family known by the common names granite prickly-phlox and granite gilia. It is native to western North America from British Columbia to Baja California and east to Montana and New Mexico.

== Description ==
This plant has been called a shrub or a perennial herb with an especially woody base. It produces several stems which may grow erect or may be short and spreading, forming a mat. Mat-forming plants are more common at higher elevations. When erect it can reach 80 centimetres (2 7/12 ft) in height but is usually shorter. The stems are densely covered in solid, narrow, sharp-pointed leaves. Flowers are solitary or grow in clusters at the ends of the stems. Each funnel-shaped flower is 1 to 2.5 cm (3/8 to 1 in) long and may be white, cream, yellowish, or pinkish in color. The flowers generally open at night, when they are pollinated by moths. The flowers and herbage are aromatic. The fruit is a cylindrical capsule with three valves, each valve holding about 5 to 10 seeds.

== Taxonomy ==
Linanthus pungens was first described in 1827 by John Torrey who named it Cantua pungens, placing it in the genus Cantua. Several moves of the species to another genus have been proposed, but it was finally placed in Linanthus in 2000 by James Mark Porter and Leigh Alma Johnson. Together with its genus it is part of the Polemoniaceae family and has five accepted subspecies.

- Linanthus pungens subsp. hallii – Native to California
- Linanthus pungens subsp. hazeliae – Native to Oregon
- Linanthus pungens subsp. hookeri – British Columbia, Washington, Idaho, and California
- Linanthus pungens subsp. pulchriflorus – California
- Linanthus pungens subsp. pungens – Widespread from British Columbia to Baja California

Linanthus pungens has 48 synonyms including 17 species names.

Table of Synonyms
| Name | Year | Synonym of: | Notes |
|---|---|---|---|
| Aegochloa torreyi G.Don | 1837 | subsp. pungens | = het. |
| Batanthes pungens (Torr.) Raf. | 1832 | L. pungens | ≡ hom. |
| Cantua pungens Torr. | 1827 | L. pungens | ≡ hom. |
| Gilia hallii Parish | 1899 | subsp. hallii | ≡ hom. |
| Gilia hookeri (Douglas ex Hook.) Benth. | 1845 | subsp. hookeri | ≡ hom. |
| Gilia lilacina Brand | 1907 | subsp. pungens | = het. |
| Gilia pungens (Torr.) Benth. | 1845 | L. pungens | ≡ hom., nom. illeg. homonym. post. |
| Gilia tenuiloba Parish | 1899 | subsp. pungens | = het. |
| Leptodactylon brevifolium Rydb. | 1913 | subsp. pungens | = het. |
| Leptodactylon hallii (Milliken) A.Heller | 1906 | subsp. pungens | = het. |
| Leptodactylon hazeliae Peck | 1936 | subsp. hazeliae | ≡ hom. |
| Leptodactylon hookeri (Douglas ex Hook.) Nutt. | 1848 | subsp. hookeri | ≡ hom. |
| Leptodactylon lilacinum Greene ex Brand | 1907 | subsp. pungens | = het. |
| Leptodactylon pungens (Torr.) Nutt. | 1848 | L. pungens | ≡ hom. |
| Leptodactylon tenuilobum (Parish) A.Heller | 1906 | subsp. pungens | = het. |
| Navarretia pungens (Torr.) Kuntze | 1891 | L. pungens | ≡ hom., nom. illeg. homonym. post. |
| Phlox hookeri Douglas ex Hook. | 1837 | subsp. hookeri | ≡ hom. |
Notes: ≡ homotypic synonym; = heterotypic synonym

== Range and habitat ==
This plant occurs in pine forests, pinyon-juniper woodlands, sagebrush steppe, and grasslands, and their ecotones. It can be found in subalpine and alpine climates. It can be found in mountain passes and high-elevation fell fields and in lower elevation desert washes. It can tolerate a wide range of conditions, from harsh winters on exposed mountain slopes to hot summers in desert valleys. It is more common in dry climates with low levels of precipitation, and it is tolerant of drought. The plant grows in poor, shallow, rocky, sandy, and salty soils, sometimes in thin layers of soil overlying bedrock. It can grow and is common on volcanic soils, such as pumice, lava and andesite. It is a dominant species in some areas, for example, the white pine-mountain hemlock forests and shrublands in El Dorado County, California, and the sagebrush near the U.S. Sheep Experiment Station in eastern Idaho.

== Gallery ==
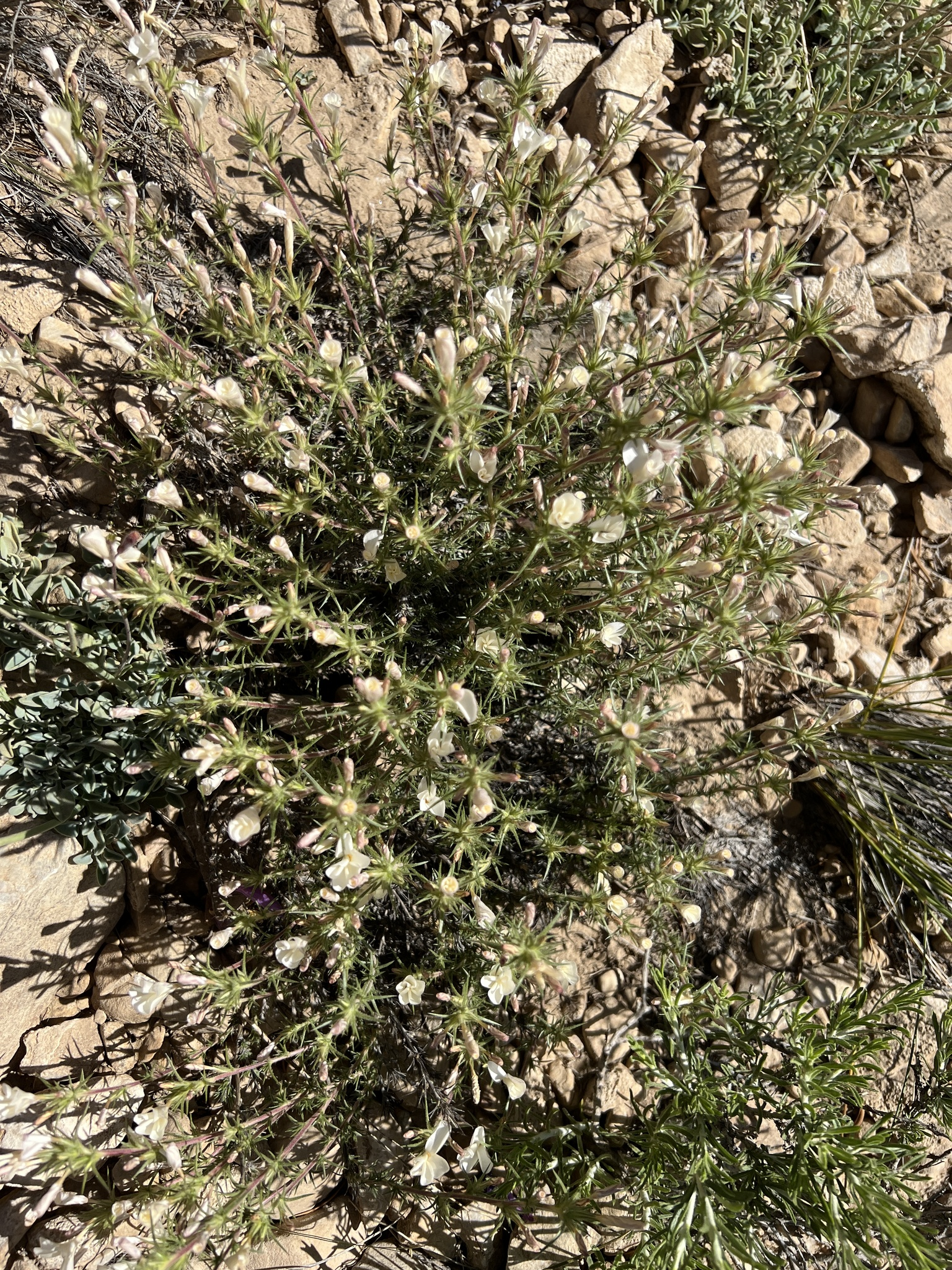
Usual daytime flowers (closed)
