= Bond sheep =

Breed of sheep

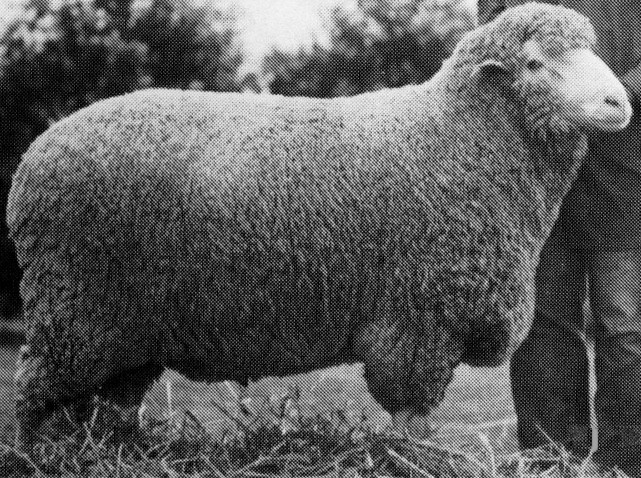
Bond ram

Bond sheep are an Australian sheep breed that was developed around 1909 near Lockhart, New South Wales by Thomas Bond when he mated Saxon-Peppin Merino ewes to stud Lincoln rams for primarily wool production. The resulting progeny was selected on the basis that they would be more suited to the Riverina environment. Initially these sheep were known as ‘the Commercial Corriedale’.

In 1979, the name was changed to Bond and the Bond Sheepbreeders Association was formed at Lockhart in 1984.

Bond are easy care, plain bodied sheep that produce white, long stapled, high yielding wool of about with a diameter of 22 to 28 microns with a fleece weight of about 7–8 kg (15–18 lb). Stud rams may weigh up to 150 kg (330 lb) under good conditions. High lambing percentages are common.

The breed is quite common in the south-east areas of Australia. Stud animals have been exported to China, New Zealand and Russia.
