= Border Leicester =

Breed of sheep

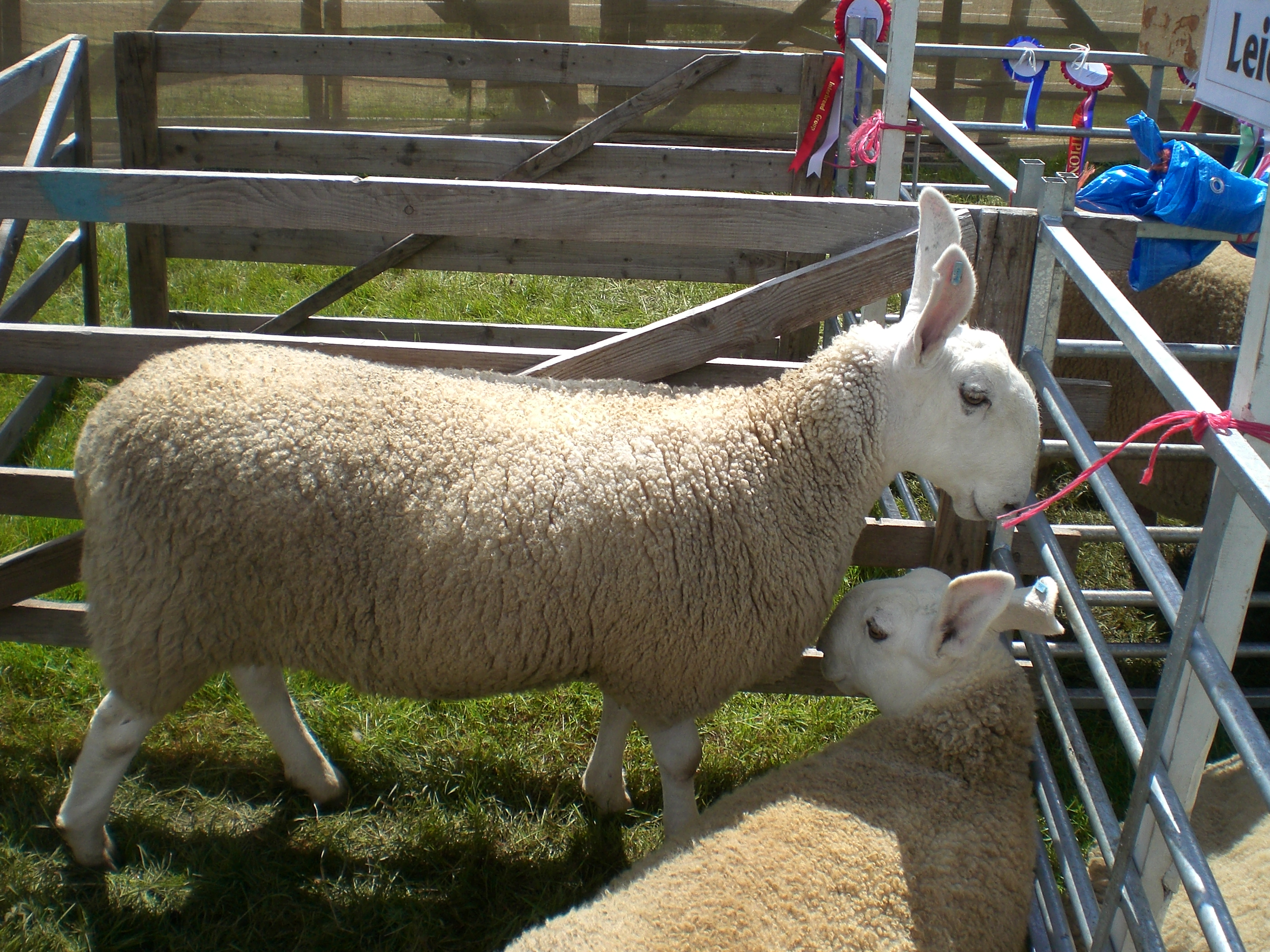
- Conservation status: RBST (2017): Category 4
- Country of origin: United Kingdom
- Distribution: United Kingdom; Australia
- Use: meat and wool

Traits
- Weight: Male: average 116 kg; Female: average 85 kg
- Height: Male: average 81 cm; Female: average 77 cm
- Wool colour: white
- Face colour: white
- Horn status: polled

The Border Leicester is a British breed of sheep. It is a polled, longwool sheep and is considered a dual-purpose breed as it is reared both for meat and for wool. It is known for its distinctive upright ears. It has been exported to other sheep-producing regions, including Australia and the United States.

== History ==
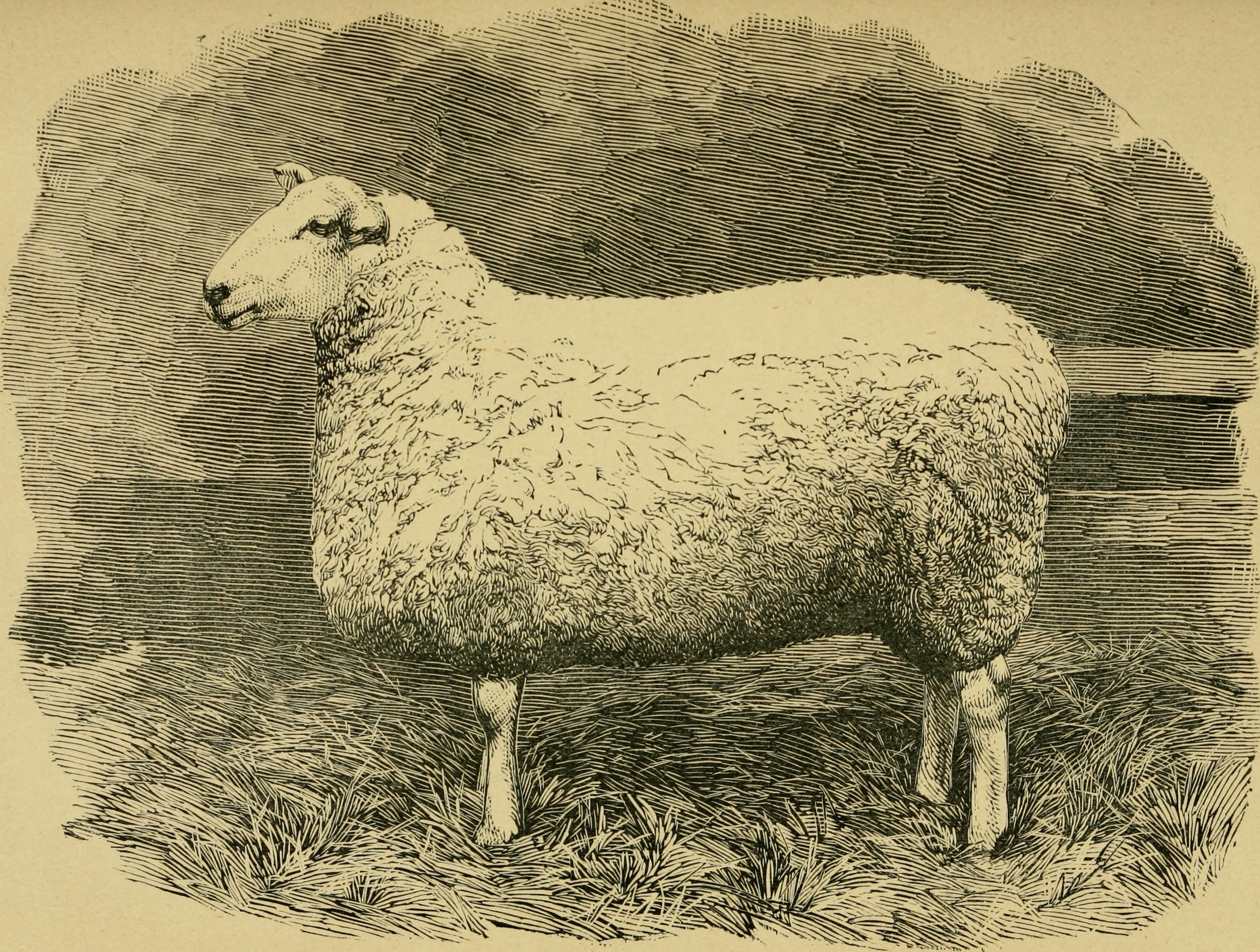
Border Leicester ewe 1893

The Border Leicester was developed in 1767 in Northumberland, England. Their name derives from the fact that their birthplace is near the border of Scotland with their foundation stock being Dishley Leicester rams. The Dishley Leicester was created and bred by Robert Bakewell (1726-1795) by crossing the old lincolnshire breed with the leicestershire type sheep. The Dishley Leicester became very popular with local farmers. George and Mathew Culley bought some of Robert Bakewell's Dishley Leicesters and the breed was soon found on both sides of the border through sales held by the Culley brothers. Around the 1830s two distinct types of Dishley Leicesters were developing on the two sides of the border. The Culley brothers were crossing their sheep with Teeswater sheep while other farmers in different areas along the border were crossing with Cheviots. This variation in the breed resulted in the two being nicknamed the "Bluecaps" and the "Redlegs". Many farmers preferred the hardier redlegs and around 1850 this variation of the Dishley Leicester became known as the Border Leicester. They were a fairly common breed in the UK by the 19th century.

=== Internationally ===
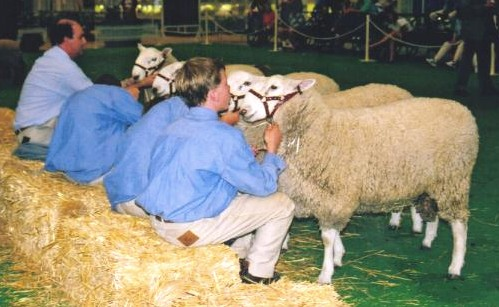
Australian strain

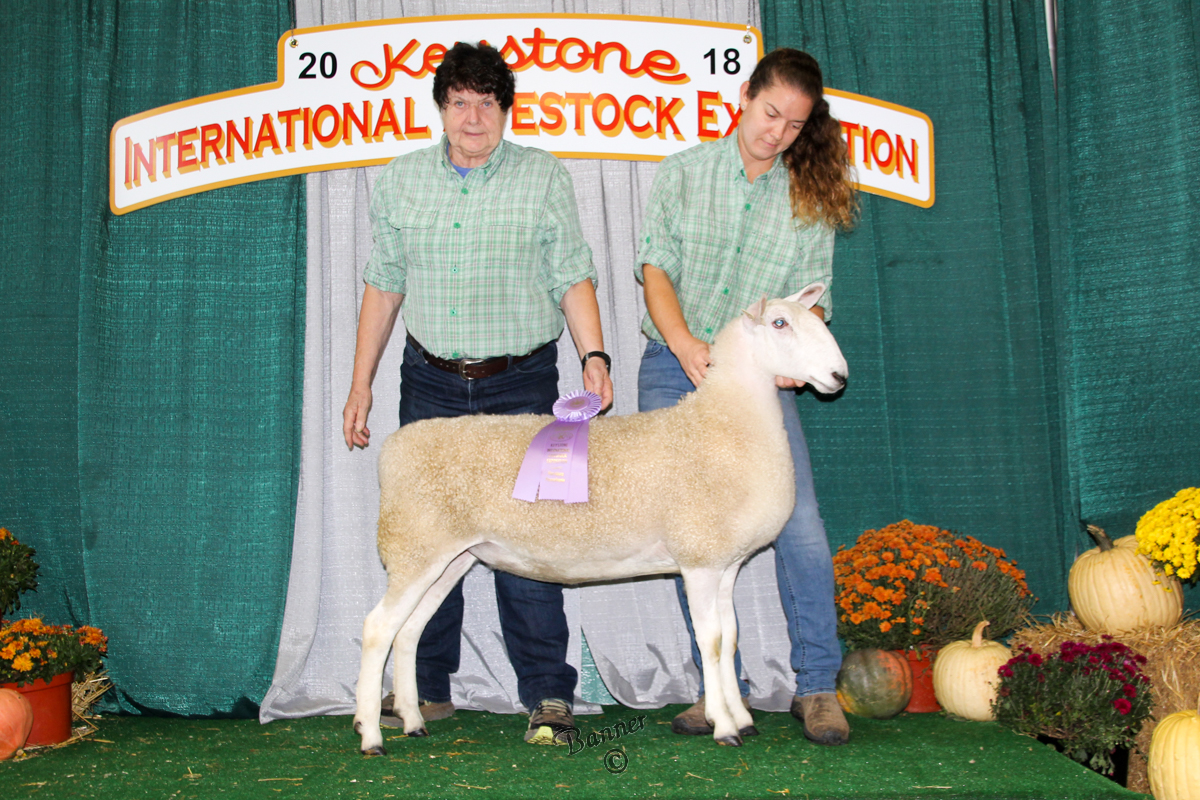
U.S. strain

Registered flocks are now found in England, Ireland, Scotland and Wales. Border Leicester sheep have been exported to Guyana, Canada, China, Colombia, South Africa, France, Spain, Portugal, United States, India, Japan, Southern Europe, Iran, Hungary, Russia, Turkey and Switzerland.

Border Leicester sheep were imported to Australia in 1871, where they now have a large number of stud flocks. Border Leicester rams are used for mating with Merino ewes to breed the first-cross mothers that are so valuable for the production of prime lambs. Border Leicester Merino cross ewes produced in this way offer the greatest overall performance when breeding meat type sheep, with a well proportioned carcase, high fertility, good foraging ability and good milk production.

Border Leicester Merino cross ewes are mated to shortwool rams (e.g. Poll Dorset or Southdown) to produce prime lambs, which grow rapidly to market weights and have the ideal carcase shape. The vast majority of Australian lambs produced for meat are bred in this manner.

Border Leicester sheep also contribute about 50 percent of the genetics used in the Gromark breed of sheep that were developed in Australia.

The breed was imported into New Zealand in 1859, and after refrigeration was introduced in the 1880s, the Border Leicester was used as a crossing sire to produce heavyweight lambs and wether mutton. The Border Leicester was later used to develop New Zealand's Border-Romney cross (Coopworth) and the Border-Corriedale (Borderdale) breeds.

The first breed association was formed in 1888 in the United States The American Border Leicester Association is the only registry in the USA. Breeders show their sheep at county shows and fairs throughout the year with the annual National Polly Hopkins Show traveling between The Big E in Springfield, Massachusetts and North American International Livestock Exposition held in Louisville, Kentucky.

== Description ==
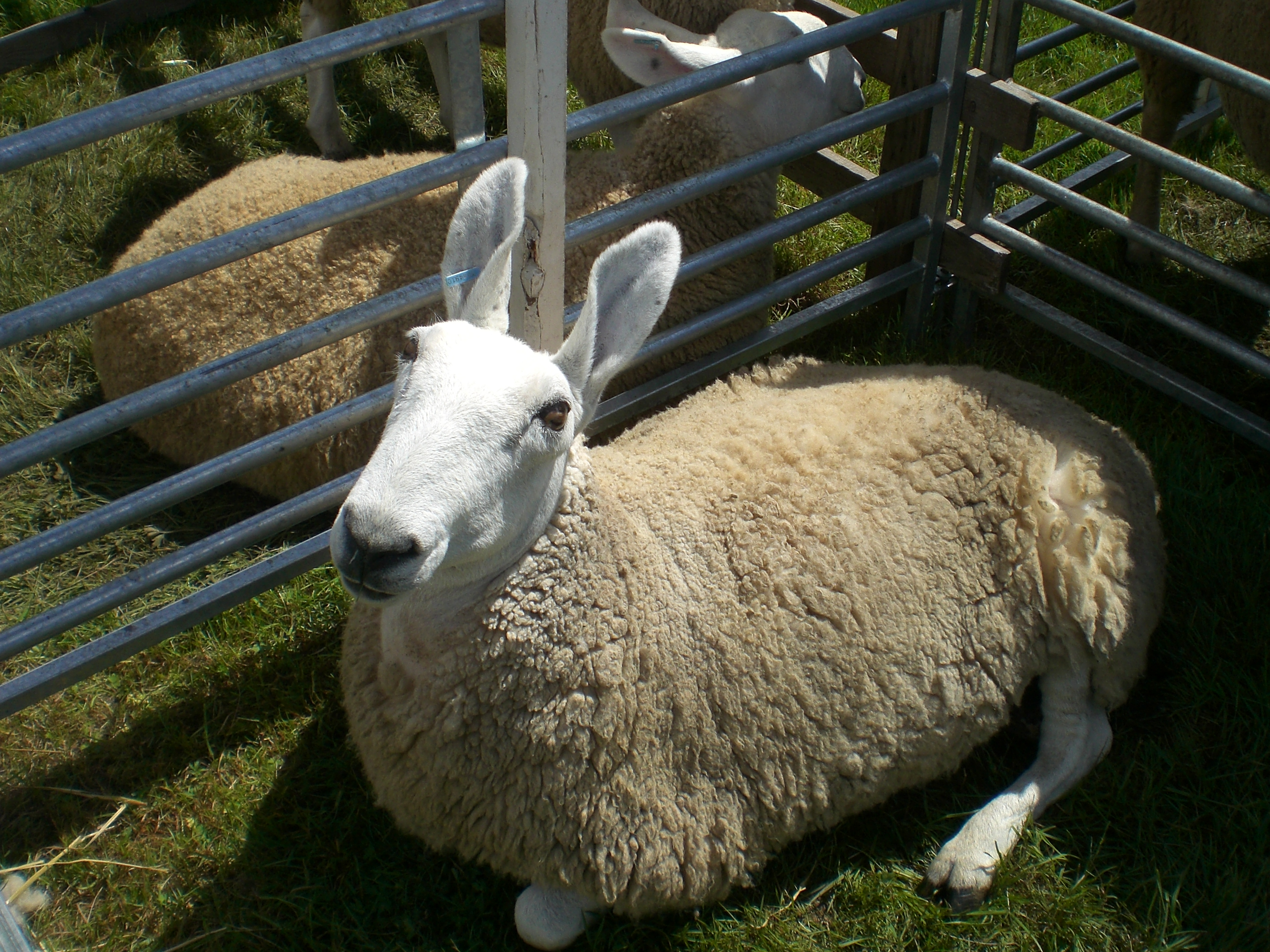
Border Leicester sheep in Scotland. Upright ears as well as Roman nose

The average weight of a mature Border Leicester ram is about 116 kg and a mature ewe 85 kg, with average heights at the withers of 81 cm and 77 cm respectively. A yearling ewe is around 64 kg (141 lb). Their white wool tends to be very long and by Merino standards, broad crimped, and in fineness about 32 to 38 microns, and is used for medium- to heavy-weight garments. This wool, though, is prized by spinners because of the crimp and lustre. The sheep are normally shorn twice a year when the wool has reached a length of around 100 mm (3.9 in). Lambs yield an average of 1.8 kg (4.0 lb) of wool; yearlings may yield 3.2 kg (7.1 lb) at each shearing. The United States, Australian and New Zealand Border Leicesters very rarely sport the extreme of British flocks. All strains of Border Leicesters are known for their docility. They produce good milk and are good mothers with a lambing percentage of about 150%.

Border Leicesters are all white with a distinct long body, well-developed chest, well-sprung ribs and a wide, strong back. The nose should be black and the ears should be large, upright and alert. Feet should also be dark in colour. The head and legs should be free of wool and only covered in short white hair making it easier for shearing. Sheep of this breed should also have a distinct Roman nose much like the North Country Cheviot.

Border Leicesters are noted for strong maternal traits, including good mothering ability and milk production, which support the rearing of lambs. Lambs typically show rapid early growth and reach market weights relatively quickly, yielding carcasses suited to meat production. The breed is generally hardy and considered straightforward to manage.

== See also ==
English Leicester
