= Polwarth sheep =

Australian breed of sheep

Polwarth
- Conservation status: FAO (2007), world-wide: not at risk; DAD-IS (2021), Australia: extinct
- Other names: Carrsdale; Dennis Comeback; Ideal
- Country of origin: Australia
- Distribution: Argentina; Brazil; Nepal; New Zealand; Romania; United Kingdom; Uruguay
- Use: meat; wool

Traits
- Weight: Male: 60–90 kg; Female: 45–55 kg
- Wool colour: white
- Face colour: white
- Horn status: polled, sometimes horned

The Polwarth is an Australian breed of sheep of Comeback or Merino cross type. It was developed from about 1880 in western Victoria by cross-breeding long-woolled British sheep – usually Lincoln Longwool – and Saxon Merino stock, and was initially known as the Dennis Comeback.

It is a dual-purpose breed, reared mainly for wool but also for meat. Stock has been exported to many countries, among them some in South America, where it is known as the Ideal.

== History ==
The Polwarth was bred in Victoria from about 1880 (Note: the date is variously given as 1880 or 1887) with the aim of creating a sheep that would have the wool qualities of the Merino, but be healthier, be better suited to cool and wet climates, be more resistant to fleece rot and fly-strike, and be better conformed for the production of mutton.

Richard Dennis, of Colac in the Western District of Victoria, started cross-breeding long-woolled British sheep – usually Lincoln Longwool – and Saxon Merino stock, and then breeding ewes from this cross back to Merino rams. The resulting offspring – genetically 75% Merino and 25% Lincoln – were then interbred for five or more generations to fix the type, which at first was known as the Dennis Comeback.

A breed society, the Polwarth Sheepbreeders' Association of Australia, was formed in Melbourne in 1919 and a stud-book established; this was closed in 1948 to registrations of stock not originating in registered flocks.

In Australia it is raised mostly in cold southern areas where rainfall is more than 500 mm per year and where pasture land has been improved; it also does well in areas where the soil is sandy and light. In 1986 there were approximately 1.9 million head in Tasmania, about 68% of the total number of the breed and over 50% of all sheep on the island. In New Zealand it has been found to adapt well to a wide range of climatic conditions and types of terrain.

Stock has been exported to many countries, including New Zealand – where the earliest imports arrived in 1932 – and some countries in South America, where it is known as the Ideal. In 2011 the Polwarth and the Corriedale were the principal sheep breeds of the Falkland Islands.

== Characteristics ==
The Polwarth is similar in appearance to the Merino. It is of medium size, large-framed and robust, and is usually polled though it may also be horned. It is white-woolled, with a long, soft, fine fleece, and is white-faced, although the nose may be mottled with black; the face and legs are free of kemp.

Body weights of mature ewes vary from 45 to 55 kg and for rams from 60 to 90 kg. Ewes can be bred year-round; the twinning rate is approximately 10%.

== Use ==
The Polwarth is reared principally for wool, although it is better suited to mutton production than the Merino and may also be used for that purpose. Ewe fleeces usually weigh from 4 to 5.5 kg greasy, with a fibre diameter of some 23 to 25 μm (equivalent to a Bradford Count of 58s–60s); the wool has a staple length of 100 to 140 mm and is soft and crimped. It is used to make a variety of wool products; these include woollen, worsted and gabardine cloth for dresses, coats and suits; knitted clothing; yarn for hand-knitting; and felts.
