= Dorset (sheep) =

In the context of sheep, Dorset may refer to:

- the Dorset Down, a British sheep breed
- the Dorset Horn, a British sheep breed
- the Polish Modified Dorset, a Polish sheep breed developed at the University of Life Sciences in Poznań
- the Poll Dorset, an Australian sheep breed derived from the Dorset Horn
- the Polled Dorset, an American sheep breed derived from the Dorset Horn
