= Gromark =

Breed of sheep

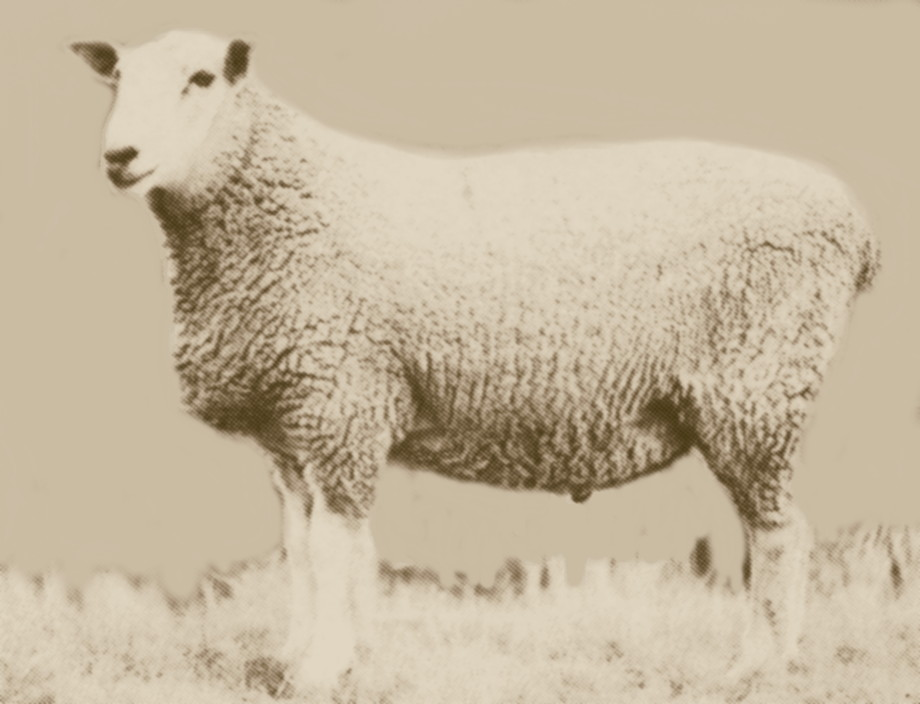
A Gromark ram

Gromark sheep are a large-framed, plain bodied dual-purpose (meat and wool) breed of sheep that were under development in 1965 by Arthur C. Godlee at "Marengo", Tamworth, New South Wales. They were selected for a high growth rate, fertility, wool quality and carcase attributes.

== Characteristics ==
The Gromark is a prime sheep fixed at approximately 69 percent Corriedale and 50 percent Border Leicester genetics. It is polled (does not have horns), has a white open face, clean legs. The long white wool fleece weighs 4-7 kilos, is about 130 mm long and averages about 30 microns in fibre diameter.

Rams average 100 kg, ewes are approximately 75-80 kg (175lb). The rams are typically used as terminal sires for first-cross fat lamb production, but the ewes do produce large lean lambs. The Gromark breed is hardy with a low incidence of fly strike and dystocia.

Since 1965 Gromark sheep have been selected by objective measurement for good growth, without excessive fat. The results are being used to provide breed-specific parameters to improve the accuracy of Estimated Breeding Values (EBV) produced by Australia's national performance testing scheme for meat sheep. In 1979 the Australian Gromark Breed Society was formed and is committed to performance recording of the breed.

This breed is mostly found in the high rainfall areas of south-east Australia, in New South Wales and Victoria. The Rare Breeds Trust of Australia has classified the breed as "recommended for investigation" into its stability as a breeding population.
