= Cormo =

Australian breed of sheep

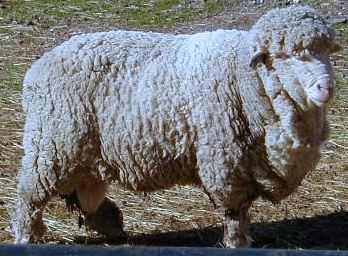
- A ram
- Conservation status: FAO (2007): not at risk; DAD-IS (2025): at risk/extinct
- Country of origin: Australia
- Distribution: Denmark; United States
- Use: dual-purpose, wool and meat

Traits
- Weight: Male: 70–90 kg; Female: 45–60 kg
- Skin colour: pink with some mottling
- Wool colour: white
- Face colour: white
- Horn status: polled

The Cormo is an Australian breed of dual-purpose sheep, reared both for wool and for meat. It was developed in Tasmania in the early 1960s by crossing Corriedale rams with Superfine Saxon Merino ewes, with selective breeding of the resulting offspring. In the twenty-first century it is either extinct or close to extinction in Australia, and endangered world-wide.

== History ==
The Cormo was bred by a Tasmanian sheep-herder named Ian Downie on his estate Dungrove, near Bothwell in central Tasmania, on the basis of advice received from the Division of Animal Genetics of the Commonwealth Scientific and Industrial Research Organisation, where Helen Newton Turner, a noted sheep geneticist, was a principal researcher. Downie wanted to increase the average body weight, the lambing rate, and the weight and quality of the fleece in his flock. To this end, he cross-bred his Superfine Saxon Merino ewes with selected Corriedale rams, and then followed a rigid programme of selection based on measurable data: rams were scored for body weight, twinning rate, fleece weight and fibre diameter, with only the highest-scoring animals retained for breeding, while ewes were assessed on the basis of fleece weight and fibre diameter only, with elimination of any that failed to meet minimum values; the best ewes were added to the ram-breeding flock, which was maintained separately from the main commercial flock. The sheep were managed extensively, without extra food or housing of any kind, so that weak or defective animals would be eliminated naturally. The first crop of lambs was born in 1959.

Exports to the United States began in 1976, and a breed society was formed there in the same year.

In 1992 the Cormo population in Australia was estimated to consist of some 70000 ewes and 700 rams; in 2004 it was reported to consist of 300 ewes only, and in 2022 it was reported to be zero. In 2007 the conservation status of the breed world-wide was listed by the Food and Agriculture Organization of the United Nations as "not at risk"; in 2025 it was listed in DAD-IS as "extinct" in Australia and "at risk" world-wide. The United States reports the breed as present, but does not report population numbers; for Denmark – where it is known as the Dansk Merino – a population of 137 head is reported, with a conservation status of "at risk/critical".

In Argentina the Cormo underwent further modification at the Estancia El Condor near Río Gallegos, in Santa Cruz Province in Patagonia, where it was further cross-bred with Corriedale and also with Peppin Merino stock – and later with Beddale and Polled Merino – to form the Cormo Argentino. In 2023 a population of 10000–100000 was reported, with a conservation status of "not at risk".

== Characteristics ==
The Cormo is of medium size, with rams weighing some 70–90 kg and ewes from 45 to 60 kg. It is polled and white-woolled, with soft pink skin – sometimes with some mottling – and a clean white open face. Greasy fleece weight of ewes is 4–5.5 kg, with a staple length of 100–130 mm and a fibre diameter of some 21–23 μm (Bradford count 60/64s). microns in diameter. It is well-conformed, fast-growing and fertile, and is well adapted to poor-quality pasture and to the extreme climatic conditions of the highlands of central Tasmania, where the winter months may be snowy and cold and the summers dry and hot.
