= U.S. Sheep Experiment Station =

Agricultural experiment station focusing on domestic sheep

Coordinates: 44.251839°N 112.222595°W

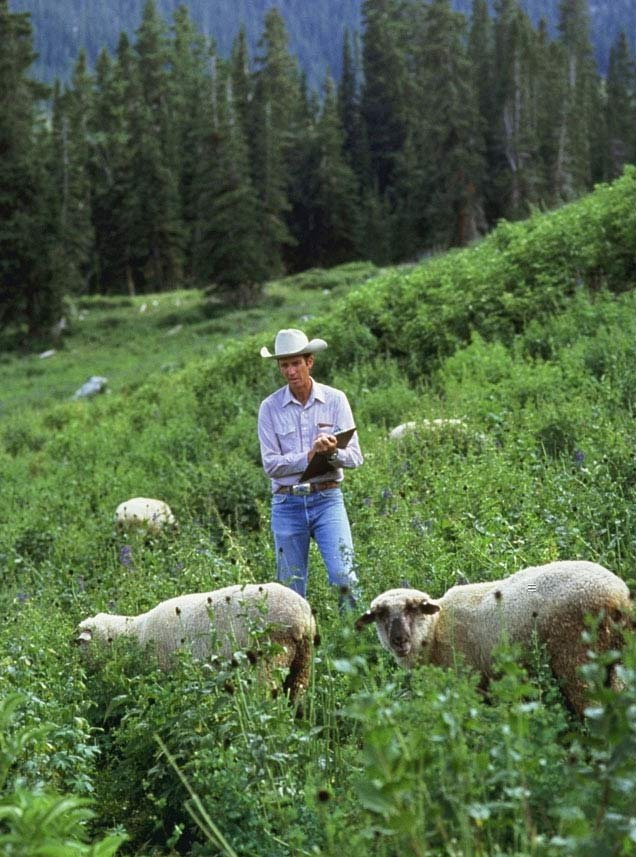
In this study at the USSES, range scientist Michael Ralphs records the sheep's plant preferences.

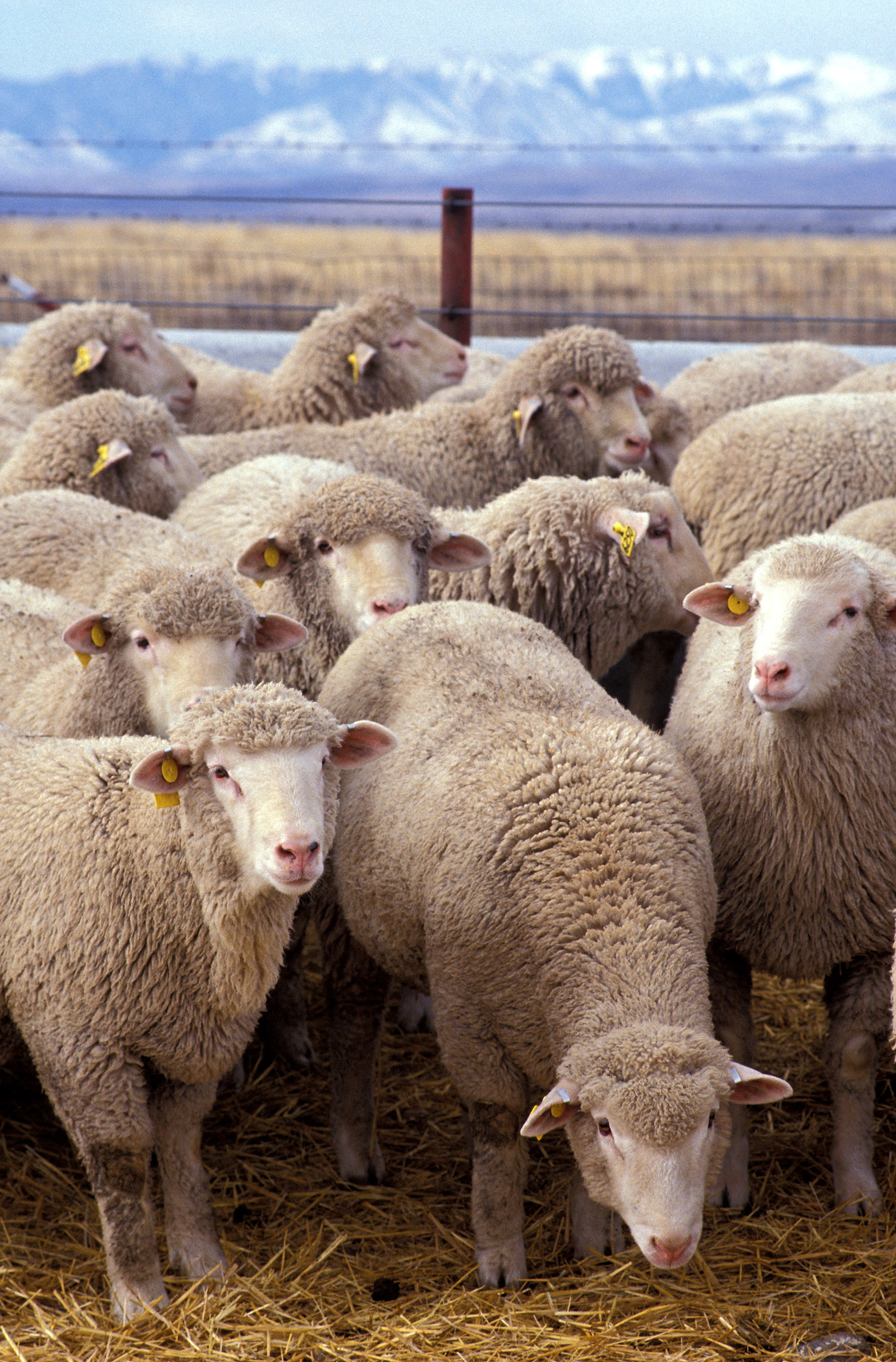
A sheep research flock at U.S. Sheep Experiment Station

The U.S. Sheep Experiment Station (USSES) is an agricultural experiment station focusing on domestic sheep (Ovis aries) which is run by the United States Department of Agriculture's Agricultural Research Service. Its stated mission is "...to develop integrated methods for increasing production efficiency of sheep and to simultaneously improve the sustainability of rangeland ecosystems".

== Geography and facilities ==
The station is located roughly six miles north of Dubois, Idaho, and its lands span both Idaho and Montana. Its headquarters are on 27,930 acres (113.0 km^{2}) of land owned by the Agricultural Research Service, including research facilities, animal facilities (such as lambing pens and dry lots), as well as residential facilities. The station is surrounded by the Caribou-Targhee National Forest, as well being within two hours of the Grand Teton and Yellowstone National Parks.

It also holds roughly 16,600 acres (67.2 km^{2}) within Montana's Centennial Mountains and 1,200 acres (4.9 km^{2}) near Kilgore, Idaho, both of which are used largely for seasonal grazing and rangeland research. The USSES spans several diverse ecosystems, including subalpine meadow, foothill, sagebrush steppe, and desert shrubland. The station is the second largest employer in Clark County, Idaho.

== Research ==
The U.S. Sheep Experiment Station conducts research in the areas of ovine reproductive efficiency, genetic improvement (especially of breeds), nutrient intake and use, ovine growth and development, range/grazing management, and product quality (i.e. meat and wool). In addition to lambs and other attendant sheep, the station has a base flock of 3,000 mature sheep.

Breeds developed at the U.S. Sheep Experiment Station include:

- The Columbia, a dual-purpose breed and one of the first originating in the U.S. Early crosses were made in Wyoming, but the originating flock was moved to the USSES in 1918.
- The Polypay, developed in the 1960s. Known for its white wool and a high lambing rate.
- The Targhee, a dual-purpose rangeland breed, named after the adjacent national forest.

One of the few areas of conflict when it comes to the station's research is its overlap with grizzly bear habitat. In 2010, the station made efforts to limit grazing in bear habitats, but by 2013 environmental groups sued, claiming that its research activities continue to threaten grizzlies in the greater Yellowstone area.

== See also ==
- Sheep husbandry
- Sheep station
