= Askanian =

Breed of sheep

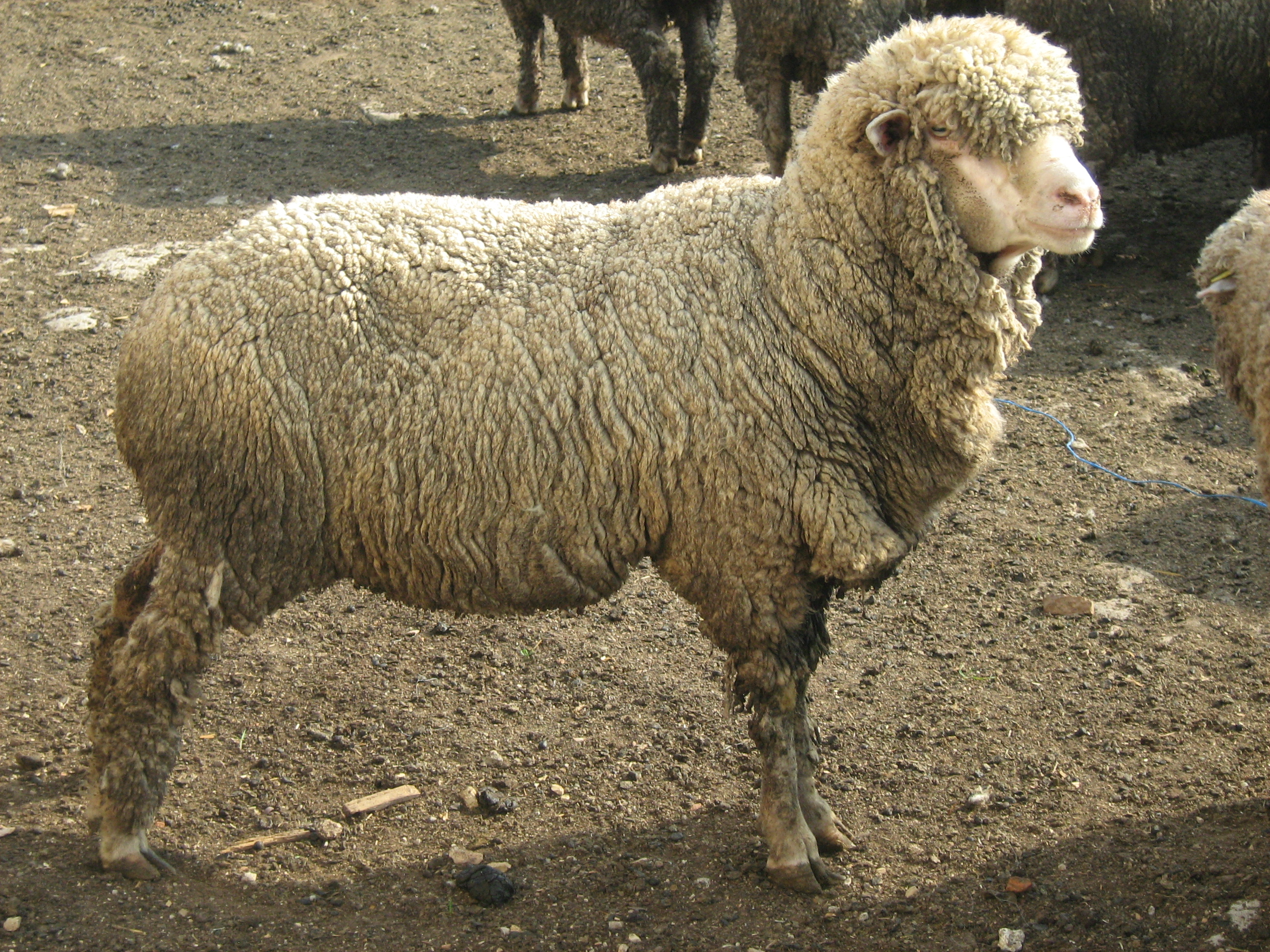
- Other names: Асканійський, Askaniysky, Асканійська тонкорунна вівця
- Country of origin: Ukraine
- Use: Wool

Traits
- Weight: Male: 115 kg (250 lb); Female: 61 kg (130 lb)
- Height: Female: 69 cm (27 in)
- Wool color: White
- Horn status: Rams are horned and ewes can be either horned or polled (hornless)

Askanian (Ukrainian: Асканійський, romanized: Askaniysky, full name: Ukrainian: Асканійська тонкорунна вівця) is a breed of domesticated sheep found in Ukraine. It is a fine-wool breed bred for its wool. It was developed by crossing American Rambouillet with Merinos in the early 1900s.

== Characteristics ==
Both sexes display a white coat and are unicolored. Rams are horned and ewes can be either horned or polled (hornless). On average and at maturity, rams weigh 115 kg (250 lb). Ewes weigh 61 kg (130 lb), grow to 69 cm (27 in) at the withers when mature and have approximately 1.27 lambs per litter. In 1980, there were over 1.6 million.
