= Cheviot sheep =

British breed of sheep

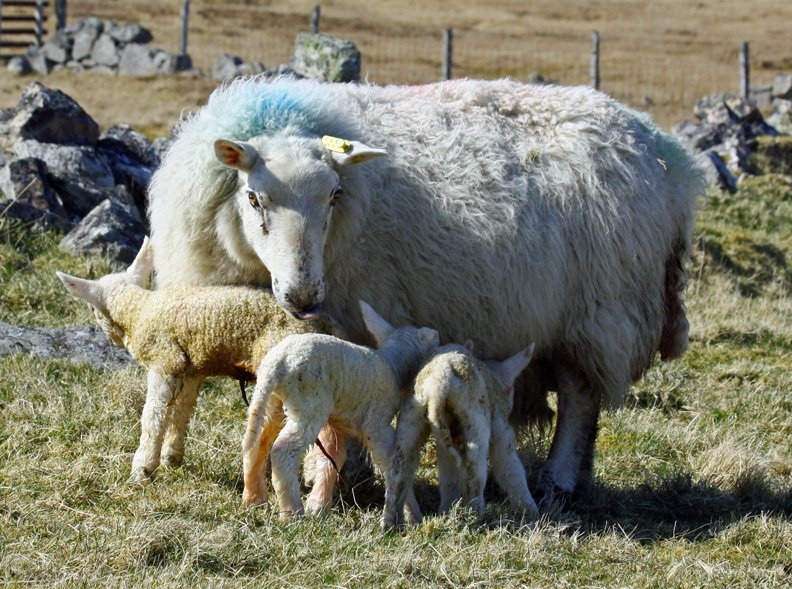
- Ewe with triplets

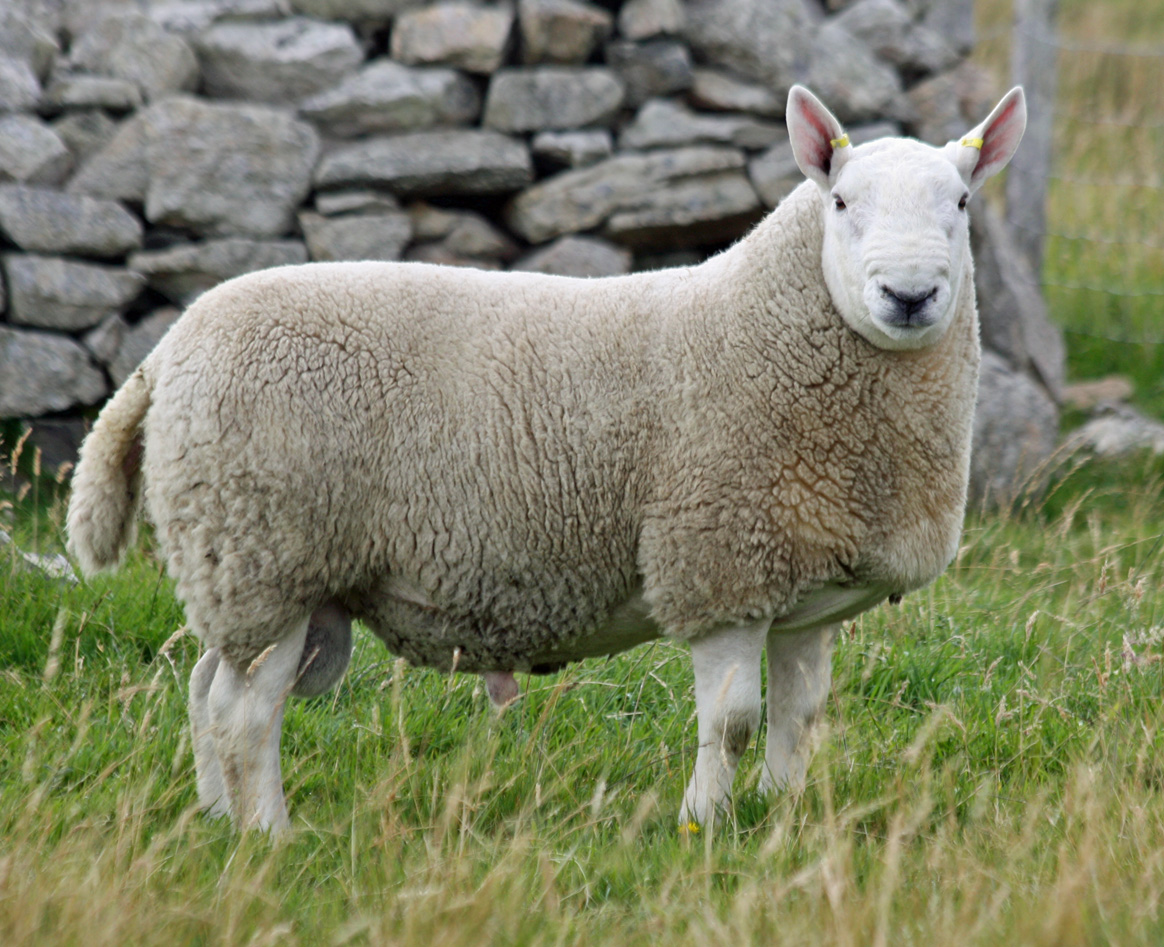
- A ram
- Conservation status: FAO (2007): not at risk; RBST (2026): not listed; DAD-IS (2026): not at risk
- Country of origin: United Kingdom
- Distribution: Australia; Canada; Ireland; New Zealand; Norway; United Kingdom; United States

Traits
- Weight: Male: average 90 kg; Female: average 55 kg
- Height: Male: average 75 cm; Female: average 65 cm
- Wool colour: white
- Face colour: white
- Horn status: usually polled

The Cheviot is a British breed of white-faced hill sheep. It originated in, and is named for, the Cheviot Hills in north Northumberland and the Scottish Borders. It is still common in this area of the United Kingdom, but also in north-west Scotland, Wales, Ireland and the south-west of England (especially Dartmoor and Exmoor), as well as more rarely in Australia, New Zealand, Norway (2%), and the United States.
