= Rambouillet sheep =

Rambouillet sheep may refer to:

- The Rambouillet, an American breed of sheep
- The Rambouillet, a French breed of sheep
