= Poll Dorset =

Australian breed of sheep

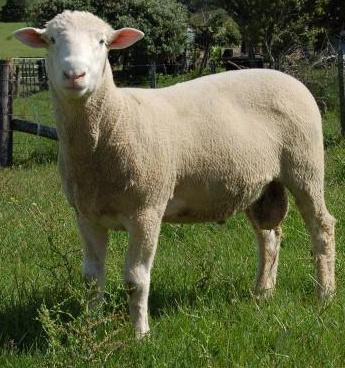
Poll Dorset ram

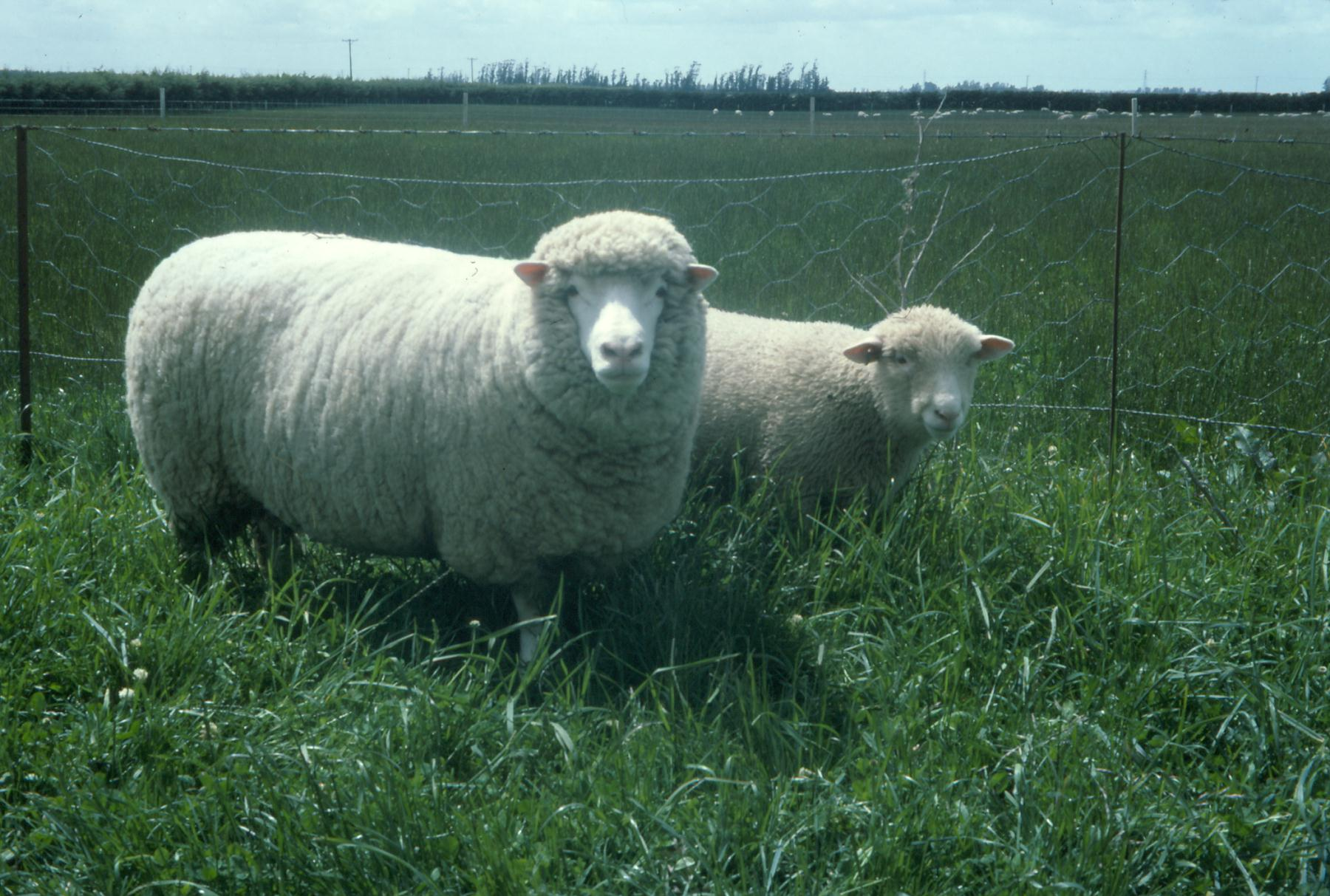
Poll Dorset ewe with a lamb, 2006

The Poll Dorset, a short-wool, meat-producing sheep, was developed in Australia between 1937 and 1954 with the aim of breeding a true Dorset type sheep without horns. The poll gene was introduced into Dorset Horn flocks from two other polled breeds and following a strict back-mating programme achieved close to 100% of Dorset Horn blood. Its main distinguishing features are its hornless appearance, long, lean square body set on short legs, pink skin and 'spongy' short-stapled wool. The Poll Dorset produces a fleece of white, dense downs type wool of 30 microns fibre diameter and it has a white wool-free face. The breed was first developed by WJ Dawkins at his property, Newbold, Gawler River, SA. commencing in 1937 using Corriedales to introduce the poll gene. In 1941, Lyall Stuart from Valmore in Whitemore, Tasmania and in 1943, Rex Wilson from Kismet in Howlong, NSW both used Ryelands to introduce the poll gene into the Dorset Horn. In 1954 these three men and Jack Reddin form Newbold, founded the Australian Poll Dorset Association.

Poll Dorset rams are the most commonly used sire for the production of prime lambs in Australia. Ewes are noted for their high fertility, mothering and milking ability. The characteristics of the breed such as rapid growth rate, superior fleshing and muscular development make them ideally suited for the meat trade. Lambs sired by Poll Dorsets can satisfy the lightweight Middle Eastern market, the local market or the export market to the US at 20 to 25 kg or heavier. Poll Dorset carcasses have excelled in Australian carcass competitions having very good eye muscle and a good lean meat to fat ratio. Poll Dorset genes have also been a major contributor to the developing of the White Suffolk breed and almost all other prime lamb composite breeds in Australia.

In 1992 a group of Poll Dorset breeders established Meat Elite Australia to share genetics and to progeny-test elite young sires to identify animals that will benefit the Australian sheep-meat industry.

The Poll Dorset breed has performed less well in thermotolerance and in high-altitude sustainability when compared to other breeds in some studies. Research continues for better genetics and treatments, largely for the role of mass breeding them for sheep-meat.
