= Dubois, Idaho =

- City
- Location of Dubois in Clark County, Idaho.

- Location in the United States
- Coordinates: 44°10′22″N 112°13′45″W
- Country: United States
- State: Idaho
- County: Clark

Area
  - Total: 2.73 sq mi (7.07 km^{2})
  - Land: 2.73 sq mi (7.06 km^{2})
  - Water: 0.0039 sq mi (0.01 km^{2})
- Elevation: 5,135 ft (1,565 m)

Population (2020)
  - Total: 511
  - Estimate (2019): 584
  - Density: 214.1/sq mi (82.66/km^{2})
- Time zone: UTC-7 (Mountain (MST))
  - Summer (DST): UTC-6 (MDT)
- ZIP codes: 83423, 83446
- Area code: 208
- FIPS code: 16-22960
- GNIS feature ID: 2410364
- Website: dubois.municipalimpact.com

Dubois (/duːˌbɔɪs/, du-BOISS) is a city in Clark County, Idaho, United States. The population was 511 at the 2020 census. The city is the county seat of Clark County.

The city was named in 1892 for Fred Dubois (1851−1930), a prominent politician in Idaho's early years. He came to Idaho in 1880, later becoming the state's first U.S. Senator, serving two non-consecutive terms (1891−97, 1901−07).

Six miles (10 km) north of town is the U.S. Sheep Experiment Station, the county's second largest employer. The station studies sheep breeds to support U.S. farmers. Dubois is near the Caribou-Targhee National Forest, which calls one of its administrative units the Dubois ranger district.

== Geography ==
Dubois is at an elevation of 5,148 feet (1,569 m) above sea level.

According to the United States Census Bureau, the city has a total area of 2.50 square miles (6.47 km^{2}), all of it land.

== Demographics ==
Historical population
Census	Pop.	Note	%±
1920	590		—
1930	312		−47.1%
1940	332		6.4%
1950	430		29.5%
1960	447		4.0%
1970	400		−10.5%
1980	413		3.3%
1990	420		1.7%
2000	647		54.0%
2010	677		4.6%
2020	511		−24.5%
2019 (est.)	584		−13.7%
U.S. Decennial Census

=== 2010 census ===
As of the census of 2010, there were 677 people, 229 households, and 167 families residing in the city. The population density was 270.8 inhabitants per square mile (104.6/km^{2}). There were 265 housing units at an average density of 106.0 per square mile (40.9/km^{2}). The racial makeup of the city was 67.1% White, 0.9% African American, 0.7% Native American, 0.3% Asian, 30.4% from other races, and 0.6% from two or more races. Hispanic or Latino of any race were 49.6% of the population.

There were 229 households, of which 41.9% had children under the age of 18 living with them, 58.1% were married couples living together, 9.2% had a female householder with no husband present, 5.7% had a male householder with no wife present, and 27.1% were non-families. 21.4% of all households were made up of individuals, and 10.5% had someone living alone who was 65 years of age or older. The average household size was 2.96 and the average family size was 3.46.

The median age in the city was 32.3 years. 32.6% of residents were under the age of 18; 8.4% were between the ages of 18 and 24; 24.6% were from 25 to 44; 22.5% were from 45 to 64; and 11.8% were 65 years of age or older. The gender makeup of the city was 51.6% male and 48.4% female.

=== 2000 census ===
As of the census of 2000, there were 647 people, 214 households, and 164 families residing in the city. The population density was 290.1 inhabitants per square mile (112.0/km^{2}). There were 245 housing units at an average density of 109.8 per square mile (42.4/km^{2}). The racial makeup of the city was 70.02% White, 1.08% Native American, 0.15% Asian, 0.15% Pacific Islander, 27.51% from other races, and 1.08% from two or more races. Hispanic or Latino of any race were 39.57% of the population.

There were 214 households, out of which 49.1% had children under the age of 18 living with them, 60.7% were married couples living together, 10.3% had a female householder with no husband present, and 22.9% were non-families. 19.6% of all households were made up of individuals, and 11.2% had someone living alone who was 65 years of age or older. The average household size was 3.02 and the average family size was 3.52.

In the city, the population was spread out, with 36.0% under the age of 18, 8.0% from 18 to 24, 27.2% from 25 to 44, 18.4% from 45 to 64, and 10.4% who were 65 years of age or older. The median age was 30 years. For every 100 females, there were 107.4 males. For every 100 females age 18 and over, there were 98.1 males.

The median income for a household in the city was $29,167, and the median income for a family was $30,417. Males had a median income of $24,444 versus $21,000 for females. The per capita income for the city was $10,389. About 21.4% of families and 20.9% of the population were below the poverty line, including 25.7% of those under age 18 and 14.1% of those age 65 or over.

== Climate ==
Dubois experiences a humid continental climate (Köppen Dfb) with long, cold winters and hot, wetter summers.

Climate data for Dubois, Idaho, 1991–2020 normals, extremes 1925–present
Month	Jan	Feb	Mar	Apr	May	Jun	Jul	Aug	Sep	Oct	Nov	Dec	Year
Record high °F (°C)	53 (12)	58 (14)	71 (22)	82 (28)	92 (33)	100 (38)	103 (39)	101 (38)	95 (35)	84 (29)	69 (21)	54 (12)	103 (39)
Mean maximum °F (°C)	41.1 (5.1)	43.5 (6.4)	58.3 (14.6)	72.2 (22.3)	80.7 (27.1)	88.5 (31.4)	94.7 (34.8)	93.6 (34.2)	87.4 (30.8)	74.2 (23.4)	56.9 (13.8)	43.7 (6.5)	95.6 (35.3)
Mean daily maximum °F (°C)	29.5 (−1.4)	33.2 (0.7)	44.4 (6.9)	56.7 (13.7)	66.7 (19.3)	76.3 (24.6)	86.7 (30.4)	85.4 (29.7)	74.6 (23.7)	58.1 (14.5)	41.0 (5.0)	29.7 (−1.3)	56.9 (13.8)
Daily mean °F (°C)	22.2 (−5.4)	25.3 (−3.7)	35.0 (1.7)	44.8 (7.1)	53.6 (12.0)	61.8 (16.6)	70.7 (21.5)	69.3 (20.7)	59.7 (15.4)	46.2 (7.9)	32.4 (0.2)	22.6 (−5.2)	45.3 (7.4)
Mean daily minimum °F (°C)	14.9 (−9.5)	17.5 (−8.1)	25.6 (−3.6)	32.9 (0.5)	40.6 (4.8)	47.2 (8.4)	54.7 (12.6)	53.1 (11.7)	44.8 (7.1)	34.3 (1.3)	23.9 (−4.5)	15.6 (−9.1)	33.8 (1.0)
Mean minimum °F (°C)	−4.7 (−20.4)	−1.8 (−18.8)	7.2 (−13.8)	19.4 (−7.0)	26.0 (−3.3)	33.6 (0.9)	43.7 (6.5)	41.4 (5.2)	30.5 (−0.8)	18.1 (−7.7)	5.2 (−14.9)	−3.7 (−19.8)	−8.8 (−22.7)
Record low °F (°C)	−28 (−33)	−27 (−33)	−13 (−25)	0 (−18)	15 (−9)	22 (−6)	30 (−1)	30 (−1)	2 (−17)	0 (−18)	−15 (−26)	−31 (−35)	−31 (−35)
Average precipitation inches (mm)	0.78 (20)	0.64 (16)	0.81 (21)	1.29 (33)	2.04 (52)	1.59 (40)	0.68 (17)	0.73 (19)	0.89 (23)	1.09 (28)	0.71 (18)	0.99 (25)	12.24 (312)
Average snowfall inches (cm)	10.1 (26)	7.6 (19)	4.5 (11)	3.2 (8.1)	0.5 (1.3)	0.1 (0.25)	0.0 (0.0)	0.0 (0.0)	0.0 (0.0)	1.4 (3.6)	6.2 (16)	13.7 (35)	47.3 (120.25)
Average extreme snow depth inches (cm)	14.8 (38)	17.0 (43)	14.4 (37)	2.2 (5.6)	0.1 (0.25)	0.0 (0.0)	0.0 (0.0)	0.0 (0.0)	0.0 (0.0)	0.6 (1.5)	3.4 (8.6)	10.2 (26)	17.9 (45)
Average precipitation days (≥ 0.01 in)	8.4	6.8	6.7	8.6	10.6	8.5	5.5	5.4	5.6	6.6	6.0	10.3	89.0
Average snowy days (≥ 0.1 in)	9.6	7.9	4.0	3.2	0.7	0.1	0.0	0.0	0.0	1.4	5.1	10.6	42.6
Source 1: NOAA
Source 2: National Weather Service

== Education ==
The sole school district in the county is Clark County School District #161.

College of Eastern Idaho includes this county in its catchment zone; however this county is not in its taxation zone.

== See also ==
- List of cities in Idaho
