= Lincoln Longwool =

British breed of sheep

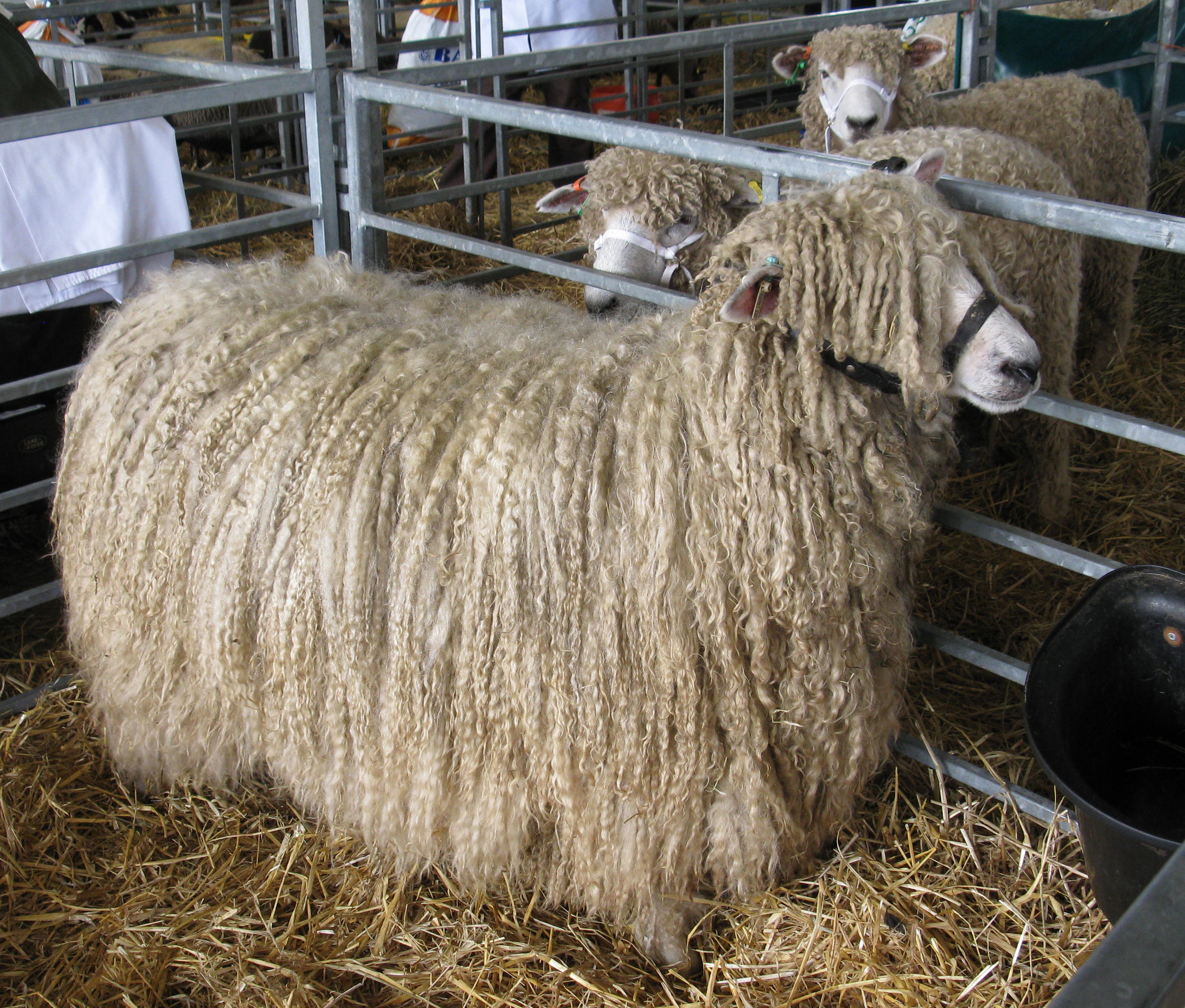

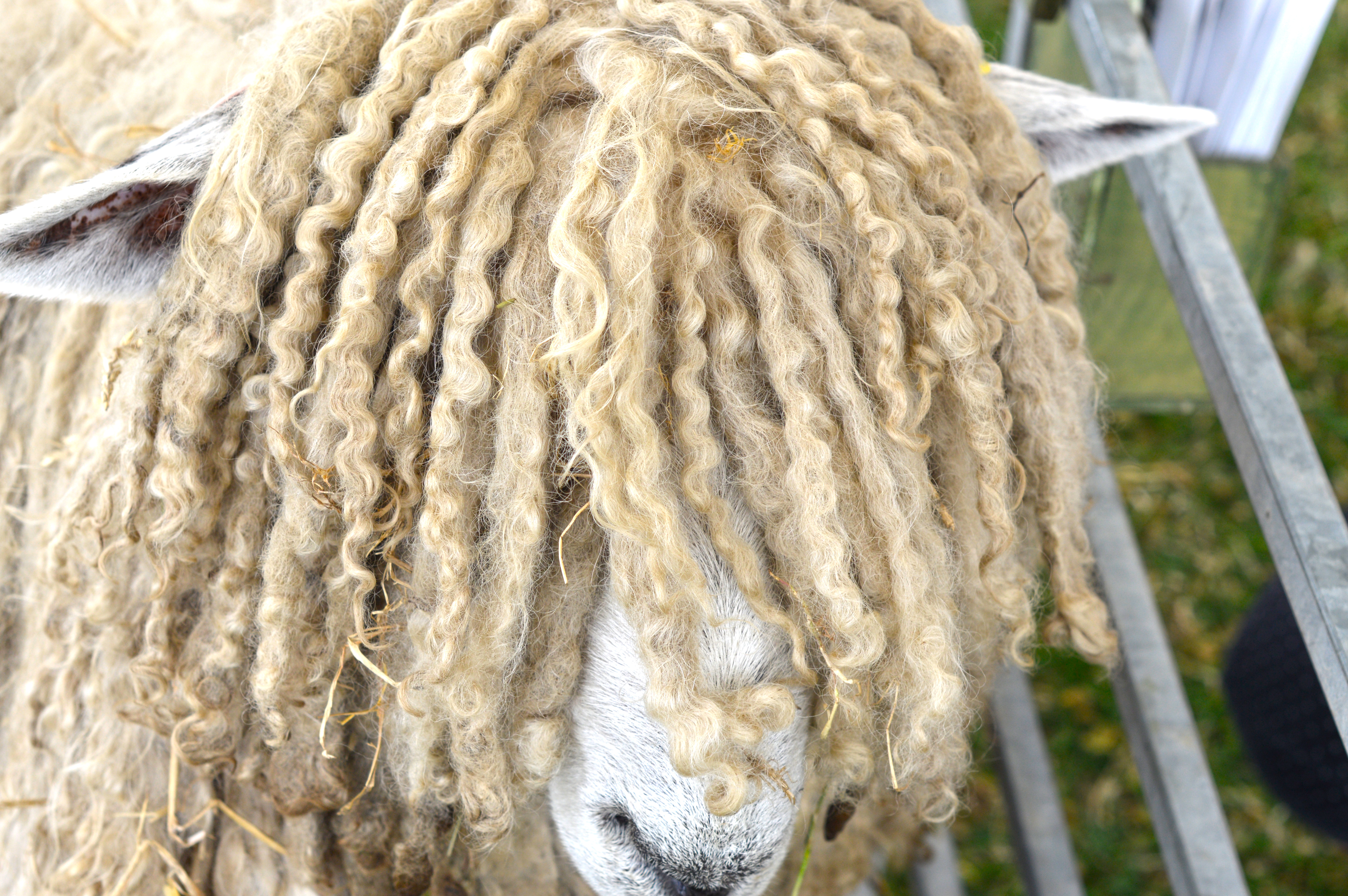
- Conservation status: FAO (2007): not at risk; DAD-IS (2025): at risk/endangered
- Country of origin: United Kingdom

Traits
- Weight: Male: 120–160 kg; Female: 80–120 kg
- Height: Male: 89 cm; Female: 80 cm
- Wool colour: white
- Face colour: white

The Lincoln Longwool is an old British breed of sheep. It is the largest sheep of the United Kingdom, and was bred specifically for wool production. The fleece is coarse, wavy, lustrous and long, and hangs in broad staples that separate easily. The heaviest fleece on record was from a Lincoln ram.

Many were exported to other countries, particularly in the twentieth century, and the Lincoln has influenced sheep husbandry in many parts of the world, often through cross-breeding with Merino stock.

In the twenty-first century it is an endangered breed, categorised by the Rare Breeds Survival Trust as "priority" – its highest level of concern.

== History ==
The county of Lincolnshire has had a strong connection with the wool trade since Mediaeval times: the City of Lincoln was one of the staple towns designated in the Ordinance of the Staple of 1353.

The sheep have been exported to a number of other countries, among them Argentina, Australia, Canada, China, New Zealand, Paraguay, the Russian Federation, Tajikistan, the United States and South Africa. The only substantial populations of the sheep are reported by Argentina, with 100000 to 200000, and by New Zealand, with 4169. In the United Kingdom a total of 675 ewes was reported for 2024, of which 251 were registered in the herd-book. The conservation status of the breed in the United Kingdom in 2025 was listed in DAD-IS as "at risk/endangered", while on the watchlist of the Rare Breeds Survival Trust it was one of six breeds of sheep listed as "priority", the highest level of concern of the trust.

The Lincoln has influenced sheep husbandry in many countries, often through cross-breeding with Merino stock. It has contributed to the development of new breeds including the Corriedale of New Zealand, the Kalinin, the Liski, the Soviet Mutton-Wool and the Tyan Shan of the former Soviet Union, and the Columbia and the Targhee of the United States.

== Characteristics ==
It is a large and massive sheep: ewe weights range from about 80 to 120 kg, those for rams some 120–160 kg.

== Use ==
The fleece is heavy – ewe fleeces weigh some 6–7 kg greasy. The heaviest fleece on record came from a Lincoln Longwool ram, with a weight of 21.1 kg The wool is coarse, wavy, lustrous and long, and hangs in broad staples that separate easily. The staple length of ewe wool generally varies between about 20 and 28 cm, but lengths in excess of 80 cm are documented. Fibre diameter is from about 37 to 41 μm, equivalent to a Bradford Count of roughly 36s-40s.
