= Ngwalwa Village =

- village
- Location in Nagaland, India Ngwalwa Village (India)
- Coordinates: 25.663770°N 93.786668°E
- Country: India
- State: Nagaland
- District: Peren
- Circle: Ngwalwa

Population (2011)
  - Total: 1,020
- Time zone: UTC+5:30 (IST)
- Census code: 268295

Ngwalwa Village is a village in the Peren district of Nagaland, India. It is located in the Ngwalwa Circle.

== Early history ==
Ngwalwa Village trace their origin and foundational history to Nkuilwangdi, presently in Senapati District of Manipur.

Ngwalwa Village was founded by Peirieng (Haume).

After the formation of Village, Haikube (Heuna) of Gaili, who was on his way to settle at Heralwa; was invited by his uncles and elders of Ngwalwa Village in order to complete the rituals.

Haikube then settled down at Ngwalwa Village and he was given a land, and it is called as Haikululwa till today.

== Location ==
Ngwalwa shares its land boundary with the following villages Ndunglwa, Dungki, Benreu, Gaili of Peren district and Ruzaphema. The present Ngwalwa Village is a gateway for many Zeliangrong villages. It is 18 km away from Jalukie Town, 36 km from the commercial town Dimapur and around 70 km from the state capital Kohima.

Ngwalwa Town and Heningkunglwa Village were originally carved out of the geographic area belonging to Ngwalwa Village.

== Demographics ==
The demographic makeup of Ngwalwa consists of its original inhabitants alongside settlers from Zeme villages—primarily Benreu, Poilwa, and Ze—and from Tenyimi tribes.

According to the 2011 census of India, Ngwalwa Village has 1020 people in 289 households (excluding Ngwalwa Town and Heningkunglwa Village). The effective literacy rate (i.e. the literacy rate of population excluding children aged 6 and below) is 80.41%.

Demographics (2011 Census)
	Total	Male	Female
Population	1020	516	504
Children aged below 6 years	152	78	74
Scheduled caste	0	0	0
Scheduled tribe	953	480	473
Literates	698	367	331
Workers (all)	846	428	418
Main workers (total)	130	102	28
Main workers: Cultivators	72	62	10
Main workers: Agricultural labourers	0	0	0
Main workers: Household industry workers	2	2	0
Main workers: Other	56	38	18
Marginal workers (total)	716	326	390
Marginal workers: Cultivators	422	181	241
Marginal workers: Agricultural labourers	6	2	4
Marginal workers: Household industry workers	2	1	1
Marginal workers: Others	286	142	144
Non-workers	174	88	86

== Culture and religion ==
In historical records maintained by British and Indian officers, the people of Ngwalwa are referred to as the 'Golomi.' Traditionally a hill-dwelling community, their vibrant local economy is deeply rooted in agriculture and livestock rearing. The culture of Ngwalwa is rich with folklore that highlights their resilience and strength; local legends often depict them as brave warriors capable of capturing tigers alive and halting natural disasters like wildfires and floods.

In recent years, the community has undergone a significant spiritual transition by adopting Christianity. Today, the village is a thriving religious community, predominantly comprising members of the Baptist denomination, along with active Christian Revival and Pentecostal groups.
