= Animal husbandry in South Africa =

Animal husbandry in South Africa has a long history which greatly predates European colonization. Nguni people who migrated to the area brought cattle with them and Khoisan people had been raising indigenous varieties of sheep for thousands of years. European settlers introduced new varieties of livestock, many of which have become important on South African rangelands.

== Cattle ==
In South Africa, both beef and dairy cattle are commercially important. Beef herds are most significant in The Eastern Cape and in KwaZulu-Natal, where communal cattle farming is still widely practiced. Commercial dairy farming is practiced in areas including Western Cape and the Free State. Holstein, Jersey, and Ayrshire are the most popular breeds of commercial dairy cattle.

== Sheep ==
When Europeans first arrived in South Africa, the raising of fat-tailed sheep was well established over much of the present day territory. Indigenous sheep breeds, which were raised more for meat than wool, include the Damara, Zulu, and Pedi sheep. During the 1800s, British settlers introduced Merino sheep, which precipitated a brief commercial wool-boom in the Cape Colony.

== See also ==
- Agriculture in South Africa
