= Afrikaner sheep =

Breed of sheep

Afrikaner
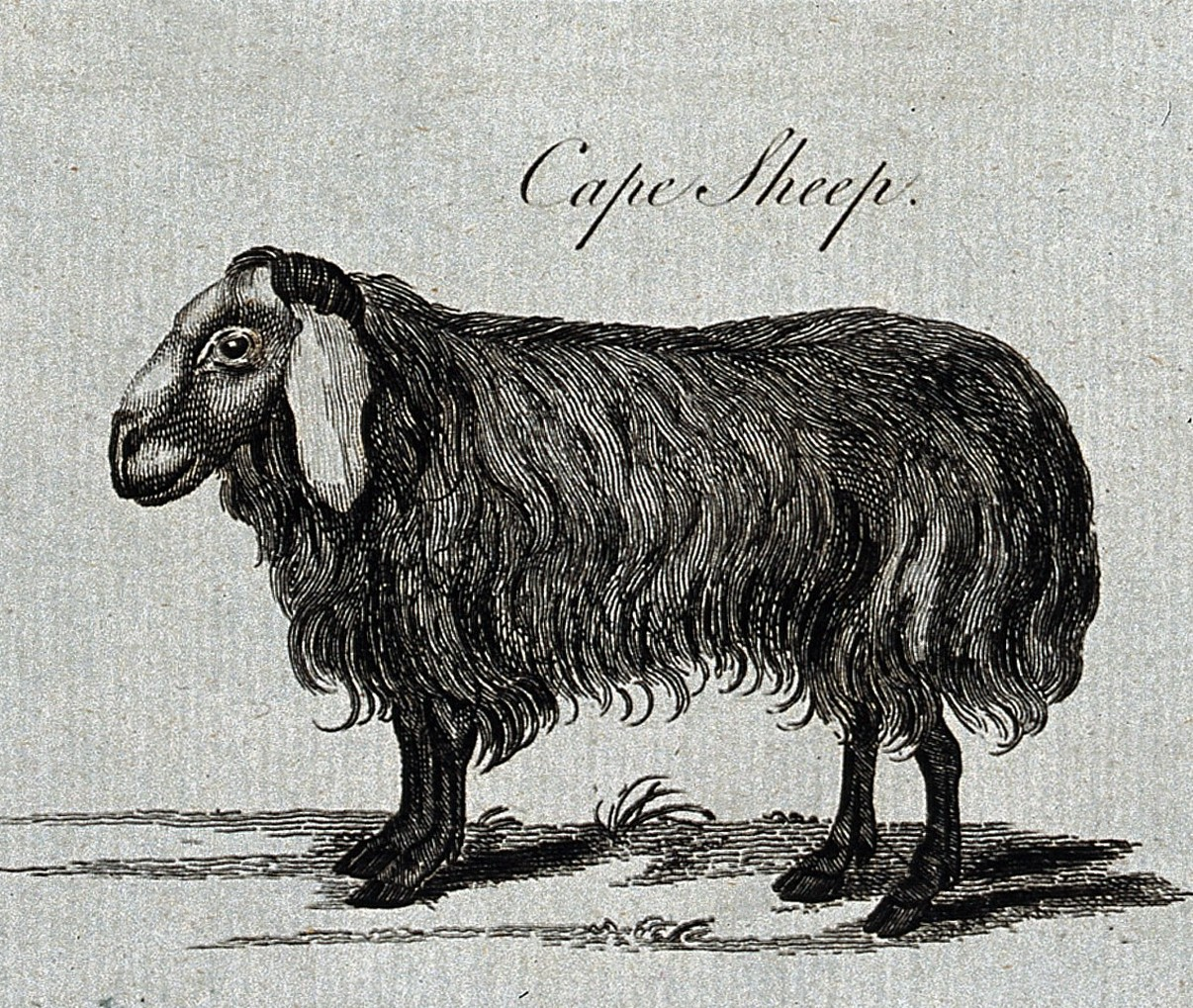
- Cape Sheep
- Other names: Cape Fat-tailed
- Country of origin: South Africa
- Hair colour: white
- Face colour: red, black

Notes
- adept to desert conditions

The Afrikaner sheep or Cape Fat-tailed is a breed of fat tailed, hair sheep indigenous to South Africa.

== History ==
Afrikaner sheep are one of the oldest native sheep breeds in South Africa, along with sheep such as the Damara, Blackhead Persian, Pedi, and Zulu (Nguni). Their ancestors were brought down from the middle east by the Khoikhoin people. Ronderib Afrikaners are thought to be the first sheep imported to Australia, with the First Fleet in 1788, but today are very rare in the country.

== Varieties ==
There are two varieties of Afrikaner sheep; the Namaqua Afrikaner and the Ronderib Afrikaner. The long, fat tail is an energy store which helps them survive long dry seasons.

The Namaqua Afrikaner is known for its hardiness in extreme environmental conditions. It is a slender, lanky sheep with a fat tail, and is not particularly favoured for modern lamb production. Namaqua Afrikaners are generally white with a red or black head, and large fat tails. What the breed lacks in market meat desirability, it makes up for in its foraging ability and hardiness in desert conditions.

The Ronderib Afrikaner is one of the larger breeds of South African indigenous sheep. There are two known sub varieties of this breed, one that has soft, fine, shiny hair being the Blinkhaar Ronderib Afrikaner, and the Steekhaar Ronderib Afrikaner having coarse hair, which was thought to be extinct. However, twenty animals were found in 1995 on a farm near Upington. The ribs of both are oval in cross section rather than flat. It is these two characteristics of coat and rib shape which distinguish this distinctive breed. Like the Namaqua Afrikaner (mentioned above) the breed is very adept to desert conditions and is remarkable for the long seasons it can survive with little or no water. The Ronderib Afrikaners show further characteristics of desert animals in that, similar to the gemsbok, their heels are close together. The aim of the old Ronderib breeders was to develop sheep with shiny coats suitable for making of skin blankets.
