= Somali sheep =

Somali sheep may refer to:

- the Blackheaded Somali, a Somali breed of sheep
- the Brazilian Somali, a Brazilian breed of sheep
- the Somali Arab, a Somali breed of sheep
