= Meatmaster =

South African breed of sheep

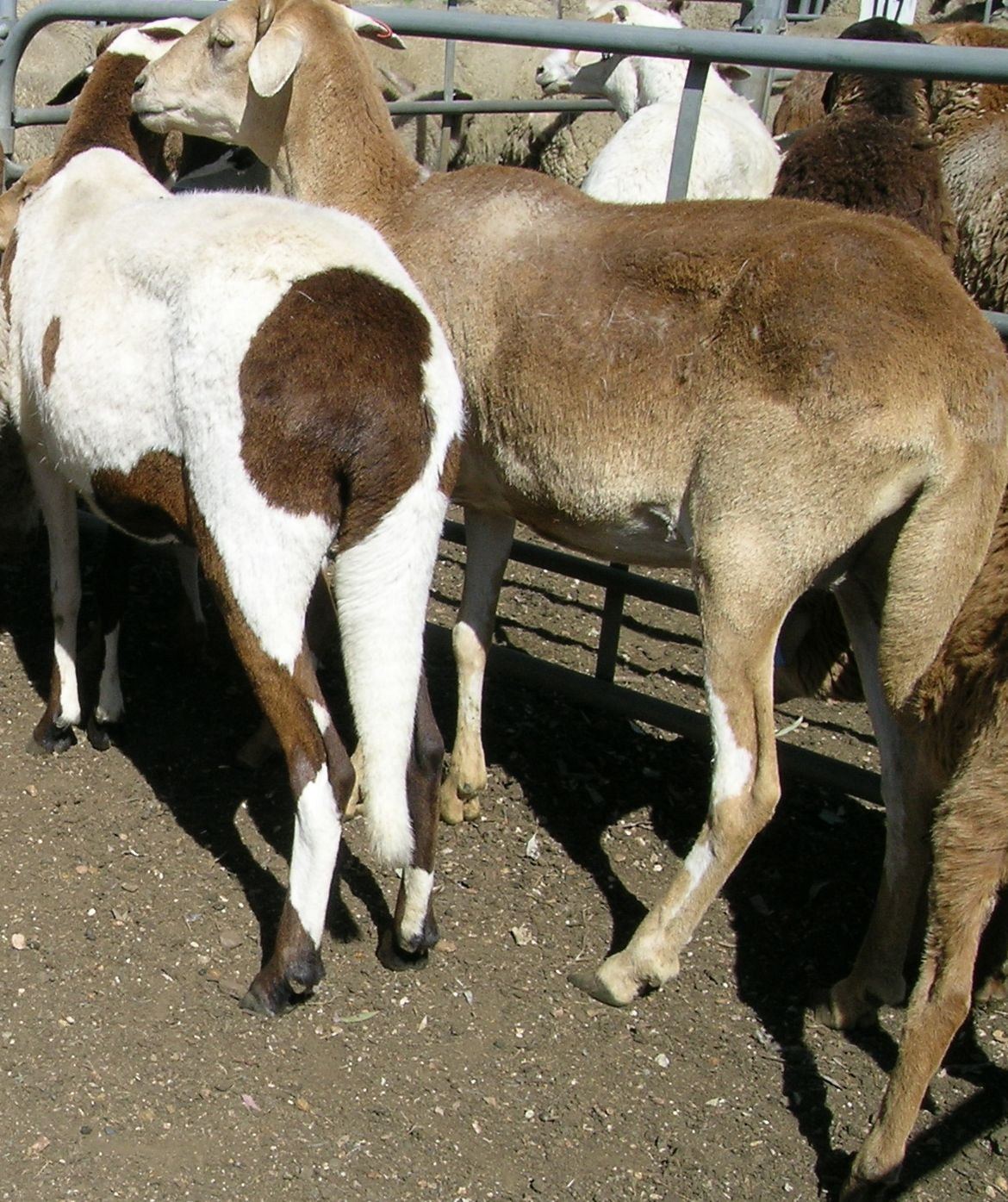
- Country of origin: South Africa
- Use: meat

Traits
- Weight: Male: 85–105 kg; Female: 60–70 kg
- Hair color: variable
- Horn status: horned or hornless

Notes
- hair sheep

The Meatmaster is a modern South African breed of domestic sheep. It was bred in the early 1990s from various hair sheep breeds, with the goal of improving the meat characteristics of African fat-tailed sheep breeds. The fat-tailed sheep had various advantageous characteristics such as hardiness and suitability for desert life, but was slow to mature, had a poor distribution of fat and lacked the muscling of the hind quarters of European breeds. The composite breed increased the amount of muscle and had a better distribution of fat but retained the hair (rather than wool) coat and other desirable traits such as resistance to tick-borne diseases and a good flocking instinct.

The new breed was tested, and demand was established, before the breed register was set up around the year 2000. The breed was registered in 2007 and a breed society was set up the following year. Today, Meatmaster bloodlines may be a composite of any number of breeds, such as Van Rooy or South African Meat Merino, but must contain Damara breeding.

Meatmasters are fat-tailed hair sheep (meaning they lack wool which requires shearing), come in a diverse array of colors, and may be either horned or polled. The focus in breeding is mostly on meat production, but they are also very hardy and with good mothering instincts (inherited from their Damara breeding). Rams weigh from 85 to 105 kilograms and ewes 60-70 kg. They are now found in all nine provinces of South Africa and are especially valued in the northern bush veld areas. Meatmasters have been exported to Namibia, Australia, and Canada.
