= Pedi =

Pedi may refer to:

== Places ==
- Pedi, Peren, a village in Nagaland, India

== People ==
- Tom Pedi, 20th century American actor
- Christine Pedi, American television and theatre actress

== Culture ==
- Pedi people
- Pedi language

== Prefixes and related abbreviations ==
  - Pediatrics, sometimes abbreviated "pedi"
  - Pedicab, sometimes abbreviated "pedi"
  - Pedicure, sometimes abbreviated "pedi"

== Other uses ==
- Pedi (sheep)
