= Idiazabal cheese =

Basque hard sheep's milk cheese

Idiazabal
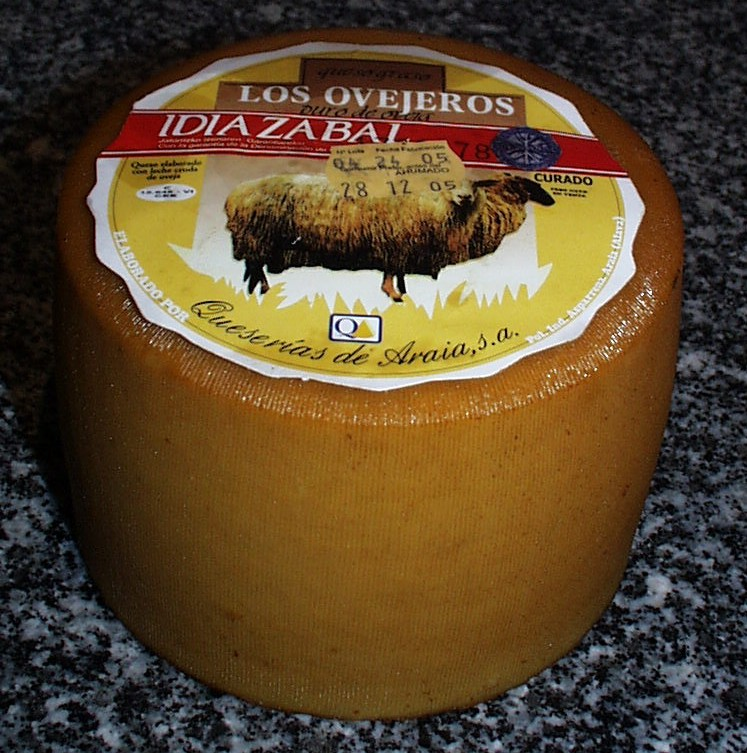
- Other names: Basque: Idiazabal gazta
- Country of origin: Spain
- Region: Basque Country
- Source of milk: Ewes
- Texture: Hard
- Certification: D.O. 1987

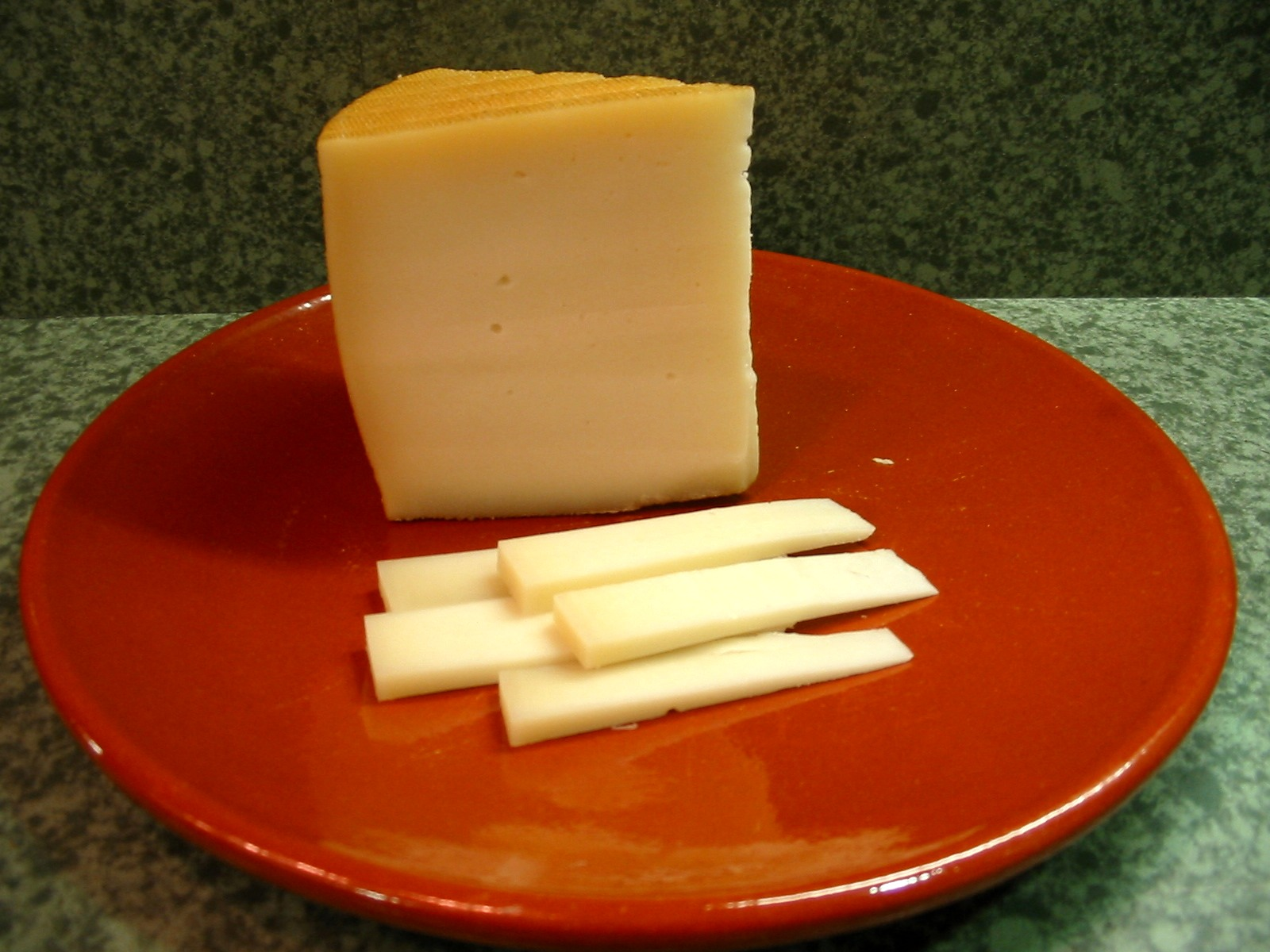
Cut Idiazabal cheese

Idiazabal is a pressed cheese made from unpasteurized sheep milk, usually from Latxa and Carranzana sheep in the Basque Country, especially in the Southern Basque Country of Spain. It takes the name from the town of the same name in the Goierri region of Gipuzkoa. It has a somewhat smokey flavor, but is usually un-smoked.

The cheese is handmade and covered in a hard, dark brown, inedible rind. It is aged for a few months and develops a nutty, buttery flavor, eaten fresh, often with quince jam. If aged longer, it becomes firm, dry and sharp and can be used for grating.

The Denomination of Origin for Idiazabal cheese was created in 1987 and defines the basic regulations for the product's manufacture. Typically, unpasteurized milk from latxa breed of sheep is used, although in some cases the D.O. permits the use of milk from Carranzana breed, from the Encartaciones in Biscay. The D.O. also stipulates that the milk be curdled with the natural lamb rennet, and permits external smoking of the cheese. The cheeses produced in the following towns in accordance with all the D.O. regulations, are therefore also protected by the Idiazabal D.O. : Urbia, Entzia, Gorbea, Orduña, Urbasa and Aralar. Recently some Basque Country farmers have begun to use hybrid Assaf sheep, which some maintain does not meet the Denomination of Origin for the cheese.

In October 1993, the International Academy of Gastronomy granted it the Gold Medal, recognizing Idiazabal cheese as one of the best European cheeses.

== Production of Idiazabal cheese ==
Idiazabal is an aged cheese, from semi-cured to cured, made exclusively from whole unpasteurized sheep's milk. It is produced by strong enzymatic coagulation. The pressed paste can be either uncooked or semi-cooked. It can eventually be externally smoked.

The milk used to produce Idiazabal must be whole unpasteurized, with a minimum of 6% fat. The milk coagulates at a temperature of 25 to 35 °C (77 to 95 °F), with the addition of natural lamb curd, resulting in a compact curdle after 30 to 45 minutes.

The curdle is cut in order to obtain rice-size grains, and then reheated to 34 to 38 °C (93 to 100 °F). In the case of coagulation at higher temperatures, the reheating temperature can reach 40 to 45 °C (104 to 113 °F). The reheated and shrunken paste dehydrates and is placed in molds where it may or may not be seasoned before pressing. Salting of the cheese is performed by rubbing the rind with dry salt or immersing the cheese in highly salted water for 24 hours. Finally, the cheeses are aged under cold and humid conditions avoiding mold, for at least two months.

The optional smoking takes place at the end of the aging process, using woods from the beech-tree, birch-tree, cherry tree or white pine. The intensity of the smoked qualities depends upon the type of wood and length of smoking. The cheeses are usually cylindrical in shape, although they are occasionally cone- or octagonal-shaped. The rinds of artisan cheeses may be engraved with drawings or symbols characteristic of the Basque culture. The rind is closed, smoked, waxy, without mold. The unsmoked cheeses have a yellow-beige color, while smoked cheeses are brownish.

The interior is compact, without air pockets or with only pin-head size holes, and is beige or pale yellow in color. The interior of the smoked cheeses has a brownish border. The taste is strong and pronounced, slightly acidic and piquant, buttery and consistent, with a characteristic sheep milk flavor. The smoked version is somewhat drier and stronger, with a pleasant aroma. The size of every cheese ranges from small to medium, with weights between 0.9 and 1.8 kg (2 and 4 lb).

== See also ==
- Ossau-Iraty
