= Australian White =

Australian White or Australian white may refer to:

- Australian White Ensign, an ensign used by ships of the Royal Australian Navy
- Australian white ibis (Threskiornis molucca), a species of a wading bird of the ibis family, Threskiornithidae
- Australian White sheep, a livestock breed
- Australian White Suffolk, a variation on the White Suffolk breed of sheep
- Australian White rabbit (disambiguation), a livestock breed and several things named for it

== See also ==
- White Australian (disambiguation)
