= Red Maasai sheep =

Breed of sheep

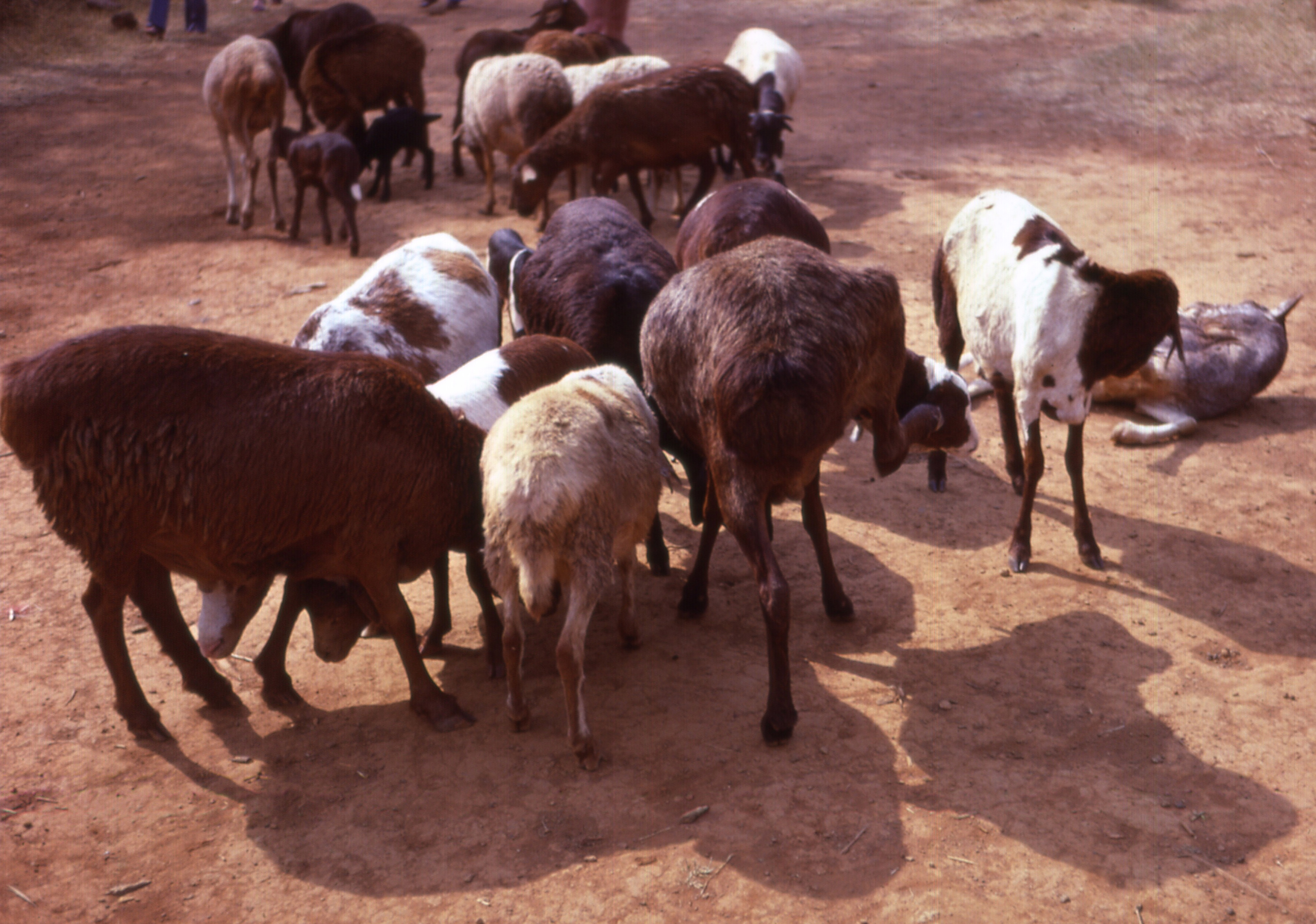
Red Maasai sheep in Kenya

The Red Maasai is a breed of sheep indigenous to East Africa. True to its name, the breed is kept by the Maasai, though both pastoralists and smallholder farmers in Kenya, Tanzania, and Uganda keep Red Maasai flocks.

The breed is a fat-tailed hair sheep; they do not produce wool and are kept primarily for meat. Though less productive than some other breeds raised in East Africa, they are valued for their hardiness in arid conditions and their relatively stronger resistance to internal parasites.

== History ==
Although their origin is unclear, Red Maasai sheep are endemic to Kenya and have long been a part of the farming cultures of the Great Rift Valley. Though traditional Maasai culture places cattle in higher prominence than small ruminants, many Maasai and smallholders in Kenya, Tanzania, and Uganda have raised the breed.

The Red Maasai was the predominant sheep breed among the Maasai and other tribes in Kenya until the 1970s, when subsidies began to support crossbreeding with Dorper sheep and other imported types. Developed in South Africa, Dorpers began to be widely crossbred with native Kenyan stock. Today, fewer purebred Red Maasai sheep remain, and crossbreeds are the majority, making the future of the breed uncertain.

== Characteristics ==
Red Maasai sheep are named for their usual color of red-brown, though they may also be pied. The breed is a hair sheep, meaning it does not produce wool, though it may have a shaggy coat of hair. It is also a fat-tailed sheep breed known for visibly large fat deposits in its tail and hindquarters. Red Maasai are medium-to-large bodied sheep. These factors mean the Red Maasai is suited to meat production instead of fiber.

Red Maasai sheep are renowned for their resistance to parasite like Haemonchus contortus. In Africa, endoparasites in particular can cause large livestock losses, because smallholder farmers that also raise crops often rely on shared grazing land. Several peer-reviewed studies have shown that compared to introduced breeds such as the Dorper, Red Maasai are significantly more resistant to parasites.

This resistance is potentially of great value to other sheep operations due to the significant financial losses caused by parasites in other sheep-producing regions. Consequently, scientists have focused on attempting to identify the genes responsible for internal parasite resistance in Red Maasai sheep.
