= Latxa =

Breed of sheep

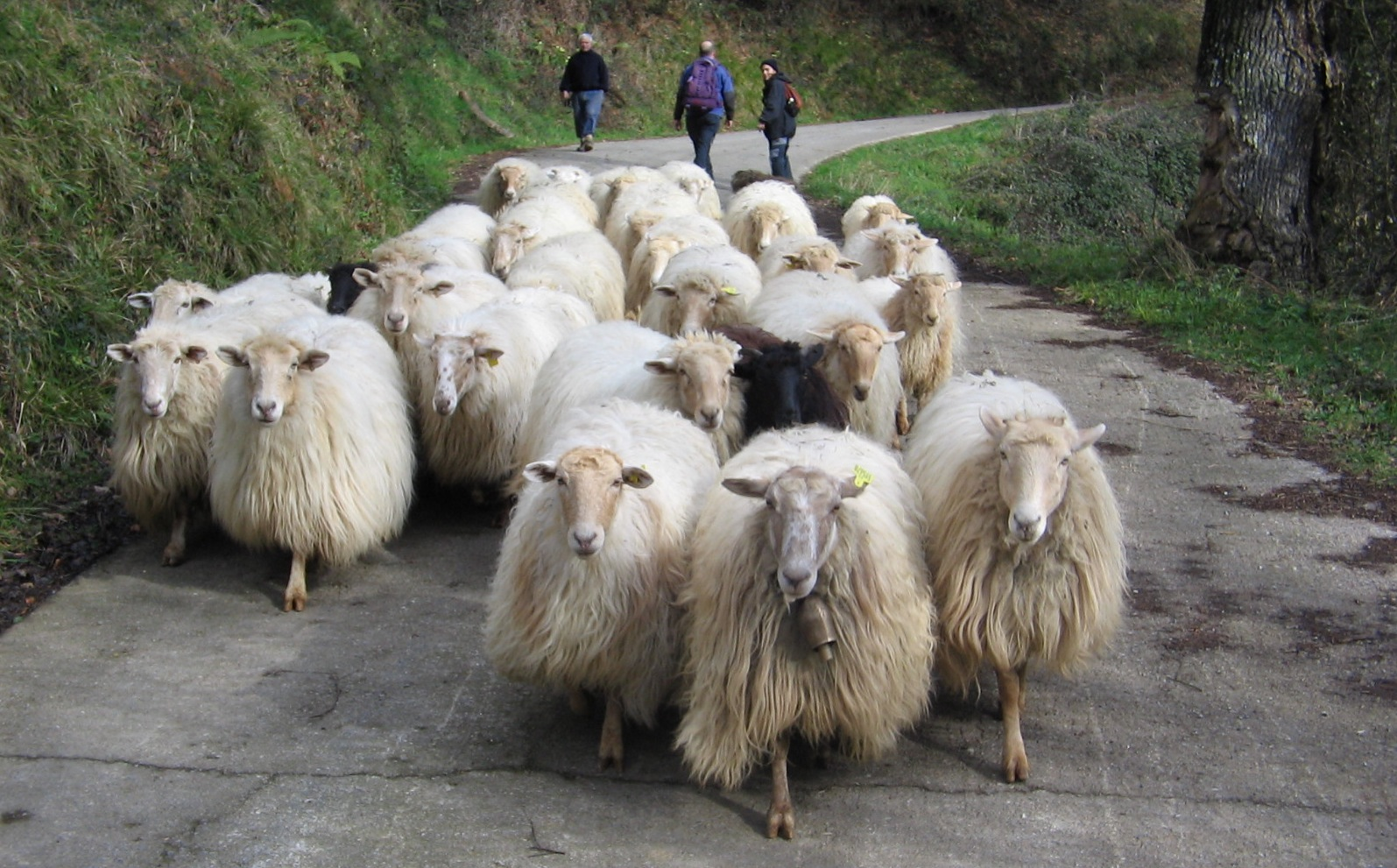
Blonde and dark-faced latxa sheep in the Basque Country

The Latxa (Basque pronunciation: [latʃa]; Spanish: Lacho/Lacha) is a breed of domestic sheep native to the Basque Country of Spain. Mostly contained within the provinces of Biscay, Gipuzkoa, Navarre and, Cantabria are dairy sheep whose unpasteurized milk is used to produce Idiazábal and Roncal cheeses. There are two sub-types of the breed, a dark-faced and a blonde.

The breed is a medium or small-sized sheep with long, coarse wool. Ewes are polled or have short horns, while rams always possess long, spiral horns. The name latxa itself refers to the rough quality of the wool, which is largely an agricultural byproduct today.

Traditionally, Latxa sheep have been managed by moving the flock to mountain pastures in summer when the ewes have finished lactating, with cheese-making taking place on the farm. Some flocks are moved while still lactating, with the animals being hand-milked on the high pastures. Since 1982, a breeding scheme has been introduced and new production methods tested. Artificial insemination is being used to provide earlier lambing and prolong the breeding season and machine milking is taking the place of hand milking. The mountain pasture is still used as a "free" resource, and the sheep do not compete with cattle and horses which graze the more level areas, because the sheep prefer herbaceous plants on more steeply sloping land.

Latxa have a seasonal lactation cycle which does not produce as great a volume of milk as other dairy breeds. Recently some Basque Country farmers have begun to use hybrid Assaf sheep, which some maintain does not meet the Denomination of Origin for the cheese.
