= Edilbay sheep =

Breed of sheep

Edilbay
- Other names: Edilbaev; Edilbaevskaya; Edil’baevskaya
- Country of origin: Kazakhstan
- Distribution: Kazakhstan, Russia
- Type: Fat-tailed
- Use: Meat, tail fat, (milk)

Traits
- Weight: Male: 115 kg (250 lb); Female: 67 kg (150 lb)
- Height: 75–84 cm (30–33 in)
- Wool color: Unicoloured black, tan or brown
- Horn status: Both sexes are hornless

Edilbay sheep (Kazakh: Еділбай қойы, Edilbaı qoıy), also known as Edilbaev(skaya) sheep (Russian: Эдильбаевская овца), are a breed of domesticated sheep which originated in northern Kazakhstan. This breed belongs to the coarse-wooled fat-tailed type of sheep and the Kazakh group. It originated in the 19th century as a cross between Kazakh fat-tailed sheep and Kalmyk/Astrakhan coarse-wooled sheep. Today, it is found in Kazakhstan (2,419,000 head as of 1980) and Russia (20,100 head as of 2003).

== Characteristics ==
Edilbaevskaya sheep are very hardy, as they were breed to conform to nomadic life in the semi-deserts and deserts of Kazakhstan. They are adapted to severe winter frosts and summer droughts, (Note: Compare for instance the climate in Aktobe (north-eastern Kazakhstan) or Pavlodar (north-western Kazakhstan).) can travel over long distances and thrive in poor feed conditions.

Their yearly lambing rate is 110–120 lambs born for every 100 ewes.

They are mainly bred for their meat and tail fat. At four months old, carcass weight is around 22 kg (49 lb) and tail fat weight is around 3–4 kg (6.6–8.8 lb). Well-grown wethers can reach a rump weight of 40–45 kg (88–99 lb) and a tail fat weight of 12–14 kg (26–31 lb).

The milk, though of lesser importance, is also used commercially, in the production of ayran, qurt, and butter. Ewes have a yearly milk yield of 152 L on average. Fat content ranges from 3–9%, with an average of 5.8%.

Their wool production surpasses all other breeds of the Kazakh fat-tailed type, both in yield and quality. The average fleece yield from two clippings is 3.3 kg (7.3 lb) for rams and 2.5 kg (5.5 lb) for ewes, fleece thickness is approximately 15 cm. The fleece consists of true wool with a fineness of 18.0 μm (54% on average), intermediate fibres (33.1 μm, 17.5% avg.), and guard hair (59.5 μm, 26%avg.). Kemp is rarely found.
