= Punglwa B =

Punglwa 'B' Punglwa 'B' (UR)
- village
- Location in Nagaland, India Punglwa 'B' (India)
- Coordinates: 25.675°N 93.845°E
- Country: India
- State: Nagaland
- District: Peren
- Circle: Pedi (Ngwalwa)

Population (2011)
  - Total: 458
- Time zone: UTC+5:30 (IST)
- Census code: 268293

Punglwa 'B' is a village in the Peren district of Nagaland, India. It is located in the Pedi (Ngwalwa) Circle.

== Demographics ==
According to the 2011 census of India, Punglwa 'B' has 100 households. The effective literacy rate (i.e. the literacy rate of population excluding children aged 6 and below) is 63.39%.

Demographics (2011 Census)
	Total	Male	Female
Population	458	253	205
Children aged below 6 years	92	51	41
Scheduled caste	0	0	0
Scheduled tribe	265	148	117
Literates	232	144	88
Workers (all)	327	177	150
Main workers (total)	86	75	11
Main workers: Cultivators	20	16	4
Main workers: Agricultural labourers	19	19	0
Main workers: Household industry workers	0	0	0
Main workers: Other	47	40	7
Marginal workers (total)	241	102	139
Marginal workers: Cultivators	36	6	30
Marginal workers: Agricultural labourers	81	27	54
Marginal workers: Household industry workers	0	0	0
Marginal workers: Others	124	69	55
Non-workers	131	76	55
