= White Australian =

White Australian may refer to:

- European Australians, Australians with European ancestry
- Anglo-Celtic Australians, an Australian with ancestry from the British Isles
- White people, who are Australians

== See also ==
- White Australia policy, a 1901 policy that permitted only Anglo and then later European migration
- Australian (disambiguation)
- Australian White (disambiguation)
- Australiana often pertains to stereotypical cultural objects of colonial Australia
- Australians
- Australian white ibis
- Australian White sheep
- White Australian Shepherd
