= Awassi =

Middle-Eastern breed of sheep

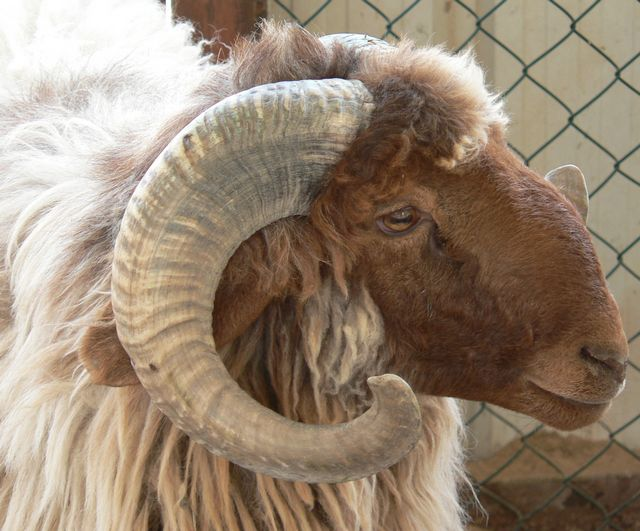
- A ram in Kuwait

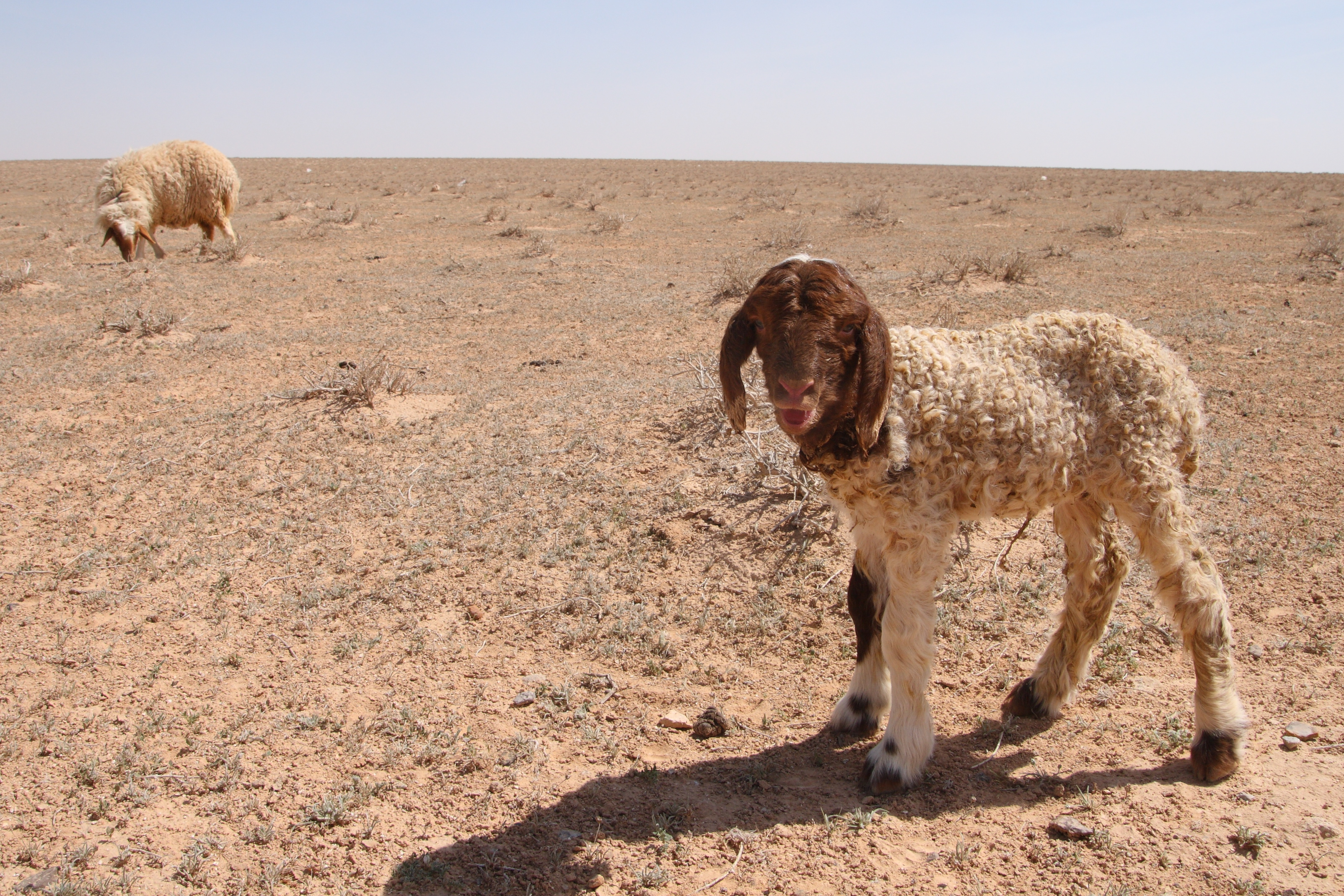
- Ewe and lamb in Syria
- Other names: Arab (Turkey); Baladi; Deiri; Gezirieh (Iraq)); Ivesi (Turkey); Shami (Syria); Syrian
- Country of origin: Middle East
- Distribution: eighteen countries in Africa, Asia and Europe
- Use: milk, meat, wool

Traits
- Weight: Male: 70 kg; Female: 68 kg
- Height: Male: 50 cm; Female: 76 cm
- Wool colour: white
- Face colour: brown

Notes
- tolerant of extreme temperatures

The Awassi (Note: Arabic: عواسي, romanized: ʿAwāsī)) is a breed of dairy sheep of Near-Eastern fat-tailed type. It is the most widely distributed non-European dairy breed. It is known by many names, among them Arab, Baladi, Deiri, Gezirieh, Ivesi, Shami and Syrian. It is usually white with brown head and legs.

== History ==
The Awassi is a traditional breed of dairy sheep of Near-Eastern fat-tailed type. Its origins are unknown, but it is thought to originate in the historic region of Mesopotamia – the area between the Euphrates and Tigris rivers, now in modern Iraq and Syria. The breed name is thought to derive from that of Al-ʿAwās, a Bedouin tribe of northern Syria. It is the most widely distributed non-European dairy breed and the most numerous sheep breed of south-west Asia. It is the principal sheep of Iraq and Syria and the only indigenous sheep of Israel, Palestine, Jordan and Lebanon.

It is reportedly present in eighteen countries in Africa, Asia and Europe, with a total population estimated in 2024 at 2.85 million head. The largest population is reported by Turkey, where the Ivesi numbers approximately 1.7–2.9 million head; other substantial populations are in Palestine (over 360000) and Lebanon (about 200000). A population in Syria of approximately 13.5 million head was reported in 2006.

It has contributed to the development of several modern breeds, among them the Assaf, Israeli Awassi, Pak Awassi, Neimi and Shafali.

The whole genome of Awassi rams in Jordan was re-sequenced in 2020, and that of ewes in the same country in 2021.

== Characteristics ==
The Awassi is of moderate size, with average weights of 68 kg for ewes and 70 kg for rams; average heights are 50 cm and 76 cm respectively. The usual colouring is white with brown head and legs; the face may also be white, grey, black or spotted, and a solid-coloured brown or black coat occasionally occurs. The facial profile is convex and the ears pendulous. Rams are normally horned, ewes more often polled. Hyperthermia causes the fertility of rams to fall during the hot summer months, but it recovers rapidly when temperatures fall in the autumn.

== Use ==
Although the Awassi is considered a dairy sheep, it is commonly reared for meat, for milk and for wool. In Syria it supplies all the wool, about 30% of all milk and about 80% of all red meat. In Iraq it is raised principally for meat.
