= Afghan Arabi =

Breed of sheep

- Country of origin: Afghanistan
- Type: Fat-tailed sheep
- Use: Meat

Traits
- Height: Female: 48 cm (19 in)
- Wool color: Grey or black
- Face color: White
- Horn status: Both sexes are polled (hornless)

The Afghan Arabi is a breed of domesticated sheep found in Afghanistan. It is a member of the fat-tailed breeds of sheep. The wool is carpet quality and the Afghan Arabi is raised for its meat.

== Characteristics ==
Both sexes are polled (hornless) and have long pendulous ears. Typically, this breed is grey or black with white markings on the face. The average height of mature ewes is 48 cm (19 in).
