= Adal sheep =

Breed of sheep

Adal
- Country of origin: Ethiopia

Traits
- Weight: Male: 35 kg (77 lb); Female: 24 kg (53 lb)
- Hair color: Unicolored from white to dark brown

Adal is a domesticated breed of fat-tailed sheep from Ethiopia. They are bred mostly for their meat.

== Characteristics ==
The Adal is unicolored from white to dark brown. Average mature weight for a ram is 35 kg (77 lb) and an ewe 24 kg (53 lb). They have short ears, often appearing to have none. At birth, males are on average 2.54 kg (5.6 lb) and ewes 2.26 kg (5.0 lb).

This sheep breed is especially adapted to arid, dry climates. Rams and ewes are polled (hornless). The Adal is classified as a fat-tailed hair breed and has short, stiff fibers.
