= Heningkunglwa =

- village
- Location in Nagaland, India Heningkunglwa (India)
- Coordinates: 25.665709°N 93.774872°E
- Country: India
- State: Nagaland
- District: Peren
- Circle: Pedi (Ngwalwa)

Population (2011)
  - Total: 1,386
- Time zone: UTC+5:30 (IST)
- PIN: 797106
- Census code: 268290

Heningkunglwa is a village in Peren district of Nagaland, India. It is located in the Pedi (Ngwalwa) Circle.

== Demographics ==
According to the 2011 census of India, Heningkunglwa has 330 households. The effective literacy rate (i.e. the literacy rate of population excluding children aged 6 and below) is 86.94%.

Demographics (2011 Census)
	Total	Male	Female
Population	1386	677	709
Children aged below 6 years	260	125	135
Scheduled caste	0	0	0
Scheduled tribe	1282	629	653
Literates	979	503	476
Workers (all)	1006	489	517
Main workers (total)	152	113	39
Main workers: Cultivators	34	19	15
Main workers: Agricultural labourers	14	14	0
Main workers: Household industry workers	2	2	0
Main workers: Other	102	78	24
Marginal workers (total)	854	376	478
Marginal workers: Cultivators	369	131	238
Marginal workers: Agricultural labourers	114	83	31
Marginal workers: Household industry workers	235	104	131
Marginal workers: Others	136	58	78
Non-workers	380	188	192
