= Waziri sheep =

Breed of sheep

The Waziri (Pashto: وزیری) is a breed of domestic sheep from the Waziristan region of Pakistan. They are also found in the Bannu District in Khyber-Pakhtunkhwa.

== Description ==
The Waziri sheep is medium-sized, and has a white, muscular body and black head with small ears. It is considered to be a microsheep, as females weigh less than 25 kg at maturity. It is part of the fat tailed sheep variety.
