= Alai sheep =

Breed of sheep

Alai
- Country of origin: Kyrgyzstan

Traits
- Weight: Male: 100 kg (220 lb); Female: 60 kg (130 lb)
- Wool color: White with occasional spots

Alai is a breed of domesticated sheep found in Kyrgyzstan. This breed is a dual purpose breed raised for its meat and wool.

== Characteristics ==
Rams can be either horned or polled (hornless). However, ewes are only polled.

The wool is white with occasional spots on their legs and heads. The wool is semi-coarse and used in carpet. On average rams are 83 cm (33 in) at the withers and weigh about 100 kg (220 lb). Ewes, on average, are 82 kg (180 lb) at the withers, weighs 60 kg (130 lb) and has a little over one lamb per litter.

The Alai is a fat-rump breed and is specifically adapted to living conditions of the Alay Valley region (above 3 km (1.9 mi) above sea level). From 1992 to 2002, the population of Alai in Kyrgyzstan has decreased from 300,000 to 200,000.
