= Van Rooy sheep =

Breed of sheep

The Van Rooy, also known as the Van Rooy White Persian, is a breed of domestic sheep native to South Africa. The Van Rooy was first developed in 1906 by (and named for) J. C. van Rooy, a South African Senator and farmer in the Bethulie district. The Van Rooy is cross between indigenous Ronderib Afrikaner sheep, and Rambouillets. It is a fat-tailed sheep and also a hair sheep, removing the need for shearing and crutching. They are generally kept for meat production, and are very well-suited to arid climates. Van Rooys are polled, have drooping ears, and are entirely white. The breed is relatively rare, even in South Africa, but has also been exported to Namibia and Zimbabwe.

In 1998, the first Van Rooy embryos were imported into Australia and rams have now been used as a foundation sires in White Dorper upgrading programs. Van Rooy genetics have also contributed to the development of the Australian White sheep breed.
