= Saryja sheep =

Fat-tailed sheep bred in Turkmenistan

- Country of origin: Turkmenistan

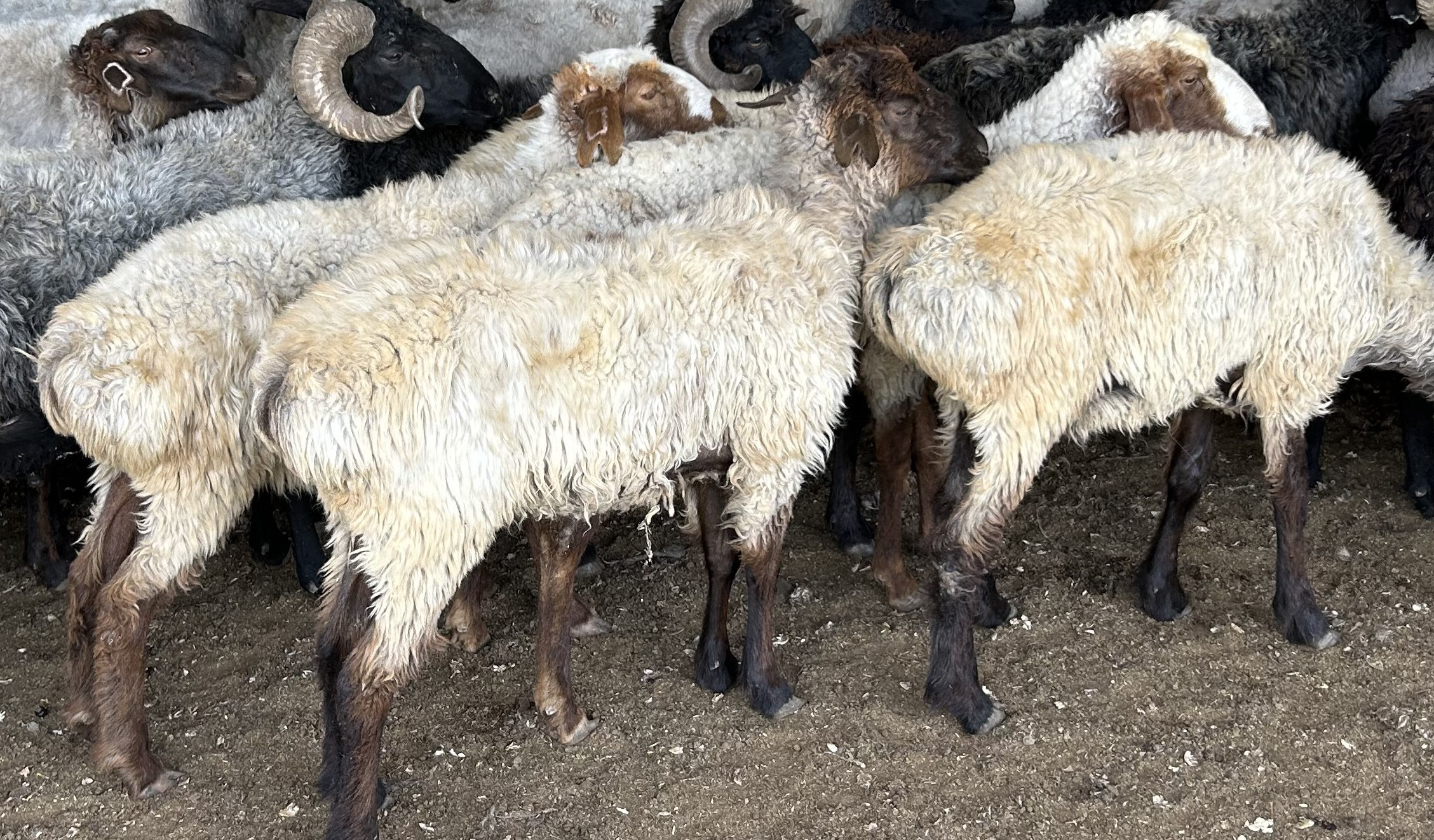
Saryja Sheep Breed in Turkmenistan

Saryja (also: Saraja; Turkmen: saryja goýuny) is a breed of fat-tailed sheep developed on the territory of Turkmenistan. The breed was developed through a long-term selection of Turkmen breeds of fat-tailed sheep, which had a high content of fluff in wool. The breed received its name from the village of Saryja, located near the Turkmen city of Mary.

== About the breed ==
Sheep of the Saryja breed are usually white in color, while the legs and head are red. The musculature is poorly developed, and the coat is semi-coarse and shiny, contains a lot of fluff and contains almost no dead hair. Fleece is of braid structure, the length of braids is 13–18 cm and the fluff is 6–9 cm.

The weight of an adult sheep is on average from 50 to 60 kg, the largest individuals reach 75 kg, the average weight of a ram is from 80 to 90 kg, and the largest reach 100 kg or more.

Saryja sheep are hardy and well adapted to year-round keeping on pastures and with limited feeding in winter. It is considered one of the best fat-tailed breeds of meat and tallow. With the help of breeding rams of the Saryja breed, such breed groups of sheep as Tajik and Karagaly were developed.

In Turkmenistan, Saryja sheep are bred in the southern part of the central Karakum, as well as on the plains adjacent to the Kopetdag Range. Also, sheep of Saryja breed are grown in Kazakhstan, Uzbekistan and Russia (Orenburg region and Altai).

== See also ==
- Akhal-teke Horse
- Turkmen Carpets
- Telpek
- Central Asian Shepherd Dog
