= Somali Arab =

Somali breed of sheep

- Conservation status: FAO (2007): no data; DAD-IS (2026): unknown
- Country of origin: Somalia
- Type: hairy coarse-woolled sheep

Traits
- Wool colour: white
- Face colour: white
- Horn status: polled

The Somali Arab is Somali breed of domestic sheep. It is one of two breeds of sheep reported by Somalia, the other being the Blackheaded Somali. It is a hairy coarse-woolled sheep, is polled, and belongs to the fat-tailed group of breeds. It is entirely white – white-woolled with a white face. It closely resembles the Radmani of Yemen, from which it may derive.

No population data has ever been reported to DAD-IS. The conservation status of the breed was reported by the Food and Agriculture Organization of the United Nations as "no data" in 2007, and in 2026 was listed in DAD-IS as "unknown".
