= Armenian Semicoarsewool =

Breed of sheep

- Other names: Armyanskaya Polugrubosherstnaya
- Country of origin: Armenia
- Type: Fat-tail
- Use: Meat, milk

Traits
- Weight: Male: 85 kg (190 lb); Female: 55 kg (120 lb)
- Height: Male: 74 cm (29 in); Female: 67 cm (26 in)
- Wool color: White
- Face color: White

Armenian Semicoarsewool (also known as Armyanskaya Polugrubosherstnaya in Russian) is a breed of domesticated sheep found in Armenia. A medium-wool fat-tail breed which is kept for meat and milk production. This breed was developed by crossing Rambouillet and Lincoln with Balbas.

== Characteristics ==
This breed displays white and is unicolored. On average, mature rams weigh 85 kg (190 lb) and grow to 74 cm (29 in). Ewes weigh 55 kg (120 lb) and grow to 67 cm (26 in) at maturity.
