= Australian white rabbit =

Australian white rabbit, Australian White rabbit, or Australian White Rabbit may refer to:

- Australian White rabbit, a breed of rabbit available in several countries but developed in Australia
- Any rabbits in Australia (an introduced pest animal there) which happen to be white
- White Rabbit Brewery, an Australian business in South Geelong, Victoria
- White Rabbit Gallery, an Australian business in Chippendale and Rosebery, New South Wales
- White Rabbit (song), an Australia-only rock music record issued by Jefferson Airplane

== See also ==
- Australian White (disambiguation)
