= Arabi sheep =

Breed of sheep

Arabi
- Country of origin: Iran, Iraq
- Use: Meat

Traits
- Weight: Male: 53.5 kg (120 lb); Female: 38.2 kg (84 lb)
- Height: Male: 81.2 cm (32 in); Female: 71.6 cm (28 in)
- Wool color: White
- Face color: White
- Horn status: Rams have horns, ewes are polled (hornless)

Notes
- Adapted to extreme temperatures and conditions

Arabi is a domesticated breed of fat-tailed sheep from southwestern Iran, southern Iraq and northeastern Arabia and Egypt. Though it does grow wool, it is primarily raised for meat.

== Characteristics ==
The Arabi rams have horns and the ewes are polled (hornless). This breed is the foundation stock for the Wooled Persian of South Africa.

It is very likely that the Arabi descends from ancient imports from Arabia, brought across the narrow Bal-el-Mandeb Straits at the mouth of the Red Sea. This breed has adapted to extreme temperatures and conditions. Within the foothills of Iraq, Kuwait and Saudi Arabia, summer temperatures rise to 41 °C (110 °F) and winter temperatures down to −26 °C (−15 °F) with less than 400 mm (16 in) rain. From 1990 to 2000, the population of the Arabi increased from 1.4 million to 1.5 million.

The Arabi is usually white; however, black, brown and black-and-brown coloration can occur. The wool has an average diameter of 26.2 micrometres. The average weight of mature rams is 53.5 kg (120 lb) with an average height at the wither of 81.2 cm (32 in). For mature ewes, their average weight is 38.2 kg (84 lb), 71.6 cm (28 in) at the withers and provides 1.6 kg (3.5 lb) of wool per shearing. Birth weight for rams is about 4.4 kg (9.7 lb) and ewes 4.0 kg (8.8 lb). On average, slightly more than one lamb is produced per litter.
