= Ngwalwa HQ =

- village
- Location in Nagaland, India Ngwalwa HQ (India)
- Coordinates: 25.581045°N 93.802587°E
- Country: India
- State: Nagaland
- District: Peren
- Circle: Pedi (Ngwalwa)

Population (2011)
  - Total: 532
- Time zone: UTC+5:30 (IST)
- Census code: 268291

Ngwalwa HQ, which is now called as Pedi, is a village in the Peren district of Nagaland, India. It is located in the Ngwalwa Circle.

== Demographics ==
According to the 2011 census of India, Ngwalwa HQ has 117 households. The effective literacy rate (i.e. the literacy rate of population excluding children aged 6 and below) is 91.42%.

Demographics (2011 Census)
	Total	Male	Female
Population	532	268	264
Children aged below 6 years	89	51	38
Scheduled caste	0	0	0
Scheduled tribe	470	234	236
Literates	405	202	203
Workers (all)	406	204	202
Main workers (total)	240	121	119
Main workers: Cultivators	87	66	21
Main workers: Agricultural labourers	101	17	84
Main workers: Household industry workers	11	5	6
Main workers: Other	41	33	8
Marginal workers (total)	166	83	83
Marginal workers: Cultivators	4	3	1
Marginal workers: Agricultural labourers	32	20	12
Marginal workers: Household industry workers	94	41	53
Marginal workers: Others	36	19	17
Non-workers	126	64	62
