= Poilwa =

- Village
- Location in Nagaland, India Poilwa (India)
- Coordinates: 25.563678°N 93.879382°E
- Country: India
- State: Nagaland
- District: Peren
- Circle: Pedi (Ngwalwa)

Population (2011)
  - Total: 2,103
- Time zone: UTC+5:30 (IST)
- Census code: 268300

Poilwa is a village in the Peren district of Nagaland, India. It is located in the Pedi (Ngwalwa) Circle. Under its territory and jurisdiction sub-village - Poilwa Namci and Heunambe Village, and hamlet - Zieboizang and Helagem settles.

Poilwa is home to many historical and tourist attractions. It includes - Sheep Farm, Poilwa Namci, the only sheep farm in Nagaland; One of the three educational institutions set up by and during British colonization; Hausum Khel Resort, Heunambe Village; Hepuidoi, Poilwa Namci; Mraikabadui or Lovers Waterfall etc.

== Demographics ==
According to the 2011 census of India, Poilwa has 384 households. The effective literacy rate (i.e. the literacy rate of population excluding children aged 6 and below) is 71.56%.

Demographics (2011 Census)
	Total	Male	Female
Population	2103	1044	1059
Children aged below 6 years	218	116	102
Scheduled caste	0	0	0
Scheduled tribe	1990	974	1016
Literates	1349	739	610
Workers (all)	1275	629	646
Main workers (total)	844	394	450
Main workers: Cultivators	697	287	410
Main workers: Agricultural labourers	1	0	1
Main workers: Household industry workers	6	5	1
Main workers: Other	140	102	38
Marginal workers (total)	431	235	196
Marginal workers: Cultivators	411	225	186
Marginal workers: Agricultural labourers	0	0	0
Marginal workers: Household industry workers	1	1	0
Marginal workers: Others	19	9	10
Non-workers	828	415	413
