= Blackhead Persian =

African breed of sheep

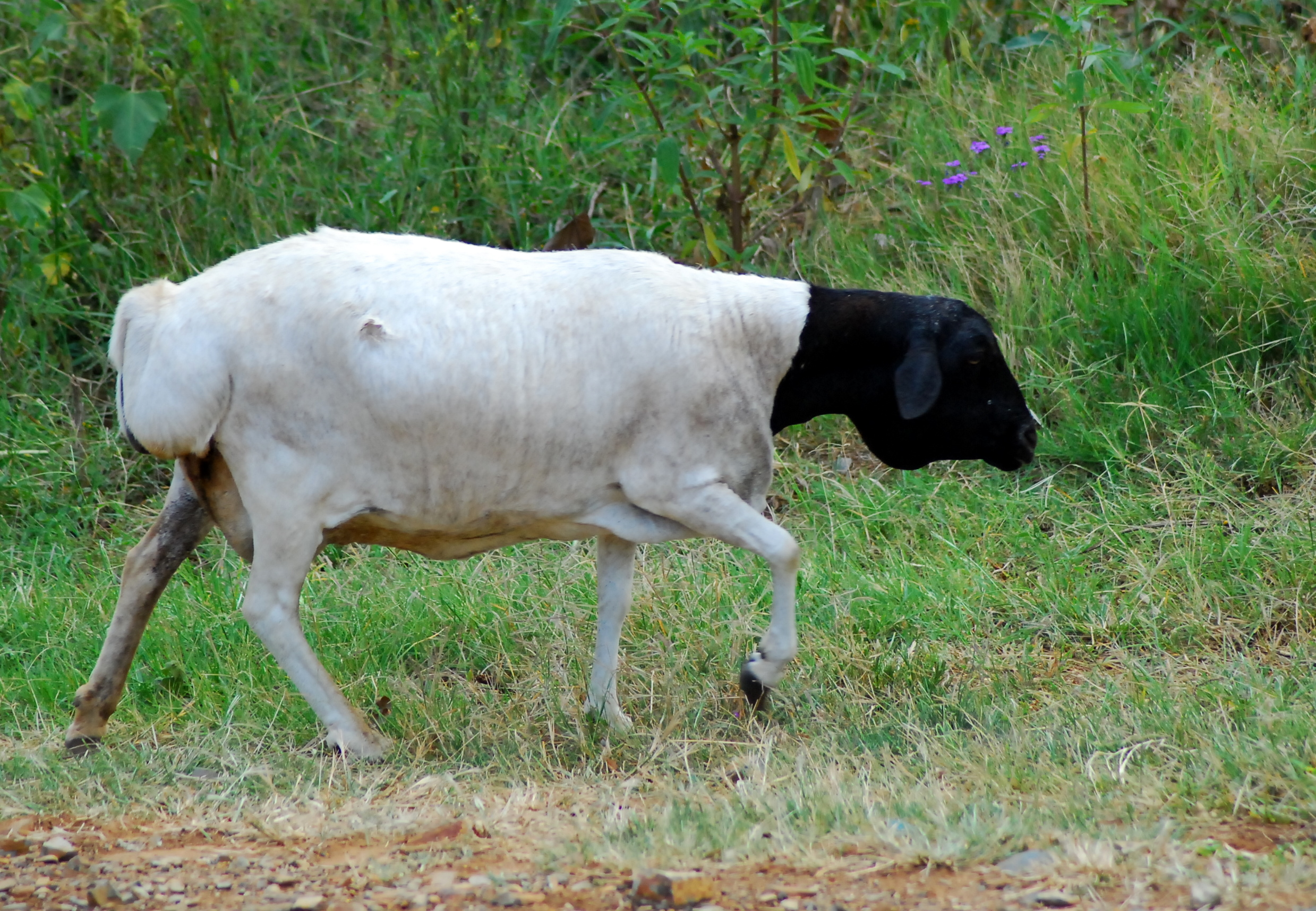
A Blackhead Persian in Pretoria, South Africa

The Blackhead Persian (also known as Swartkoppersie) is a fat-tailed breed of domestic sheep from Africa. The sheep is originally from Somalia and a direct descendant of the Somali sheep. The breed is also a type of hair sheep, meaning they do not grow wool and tolerate heat better than wooled breeds and are raised primarily for meat. The Blackhead Persian has a white body and, as their name would suggest, an entirely black head.

== Characteristics ==
The Blackhead Persian is a polled breed with both sexes lacking horns. It has a black head, with long pendulous ears, and a black neck and a white body, with a clear line demarcating the two colours. The rump and the base of the tail have an accumulation of fat. The breed was specifically bred for the large quantity of fat stored in the tail region which gave resilience in arid conditions and which was prized for cooking.

On average at maturity, rams weigh 68 kg (150 lb) and ewes 52 kg (115 lb). At birth, rams and ewes weigh about 2.6 kg (5.7 lb). Ewes lactate for approximately 84 days, produce 50 kg (110 lb) of milk with 5.9% fat.

== History ==
Despite its name, the Blackhead Persian originated in Somalia and was imported into South Africa in about 1870. A South African studbook was set up in 1906. By 1930 there were 4000 registered animals. In the 1950s there were estimated to be two million Persian Blackheads in South Africa, and they had also been introduced to Kenya, Tanzania, Ethiopia and Ghana. Since then it has been imported into the Caribbean region, Central and South America for cross-breeding purposes.

== Crossbreed development ==
It was crossbred with local breeds in South Africa and also was "improved" by crossing it with such breeds as the Dorset Horn creating the successful breed now called Dorper. And the Ghana black-headed nangue is a cross with a Djallonké sheep and a black-headed Persian.

== See also ==
- Live export
- Dorper sheep
- Blackhead Persian in Ethiopia
