= Tail fat =

Lamb tail fat

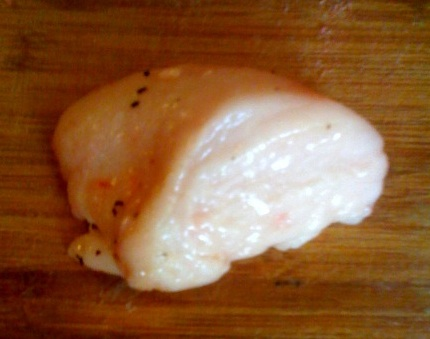
- Kuyruk yağı (tail fat) in Turkish cuisine
- Type: Cooking fat
- Place of origin: Fertile Crescent

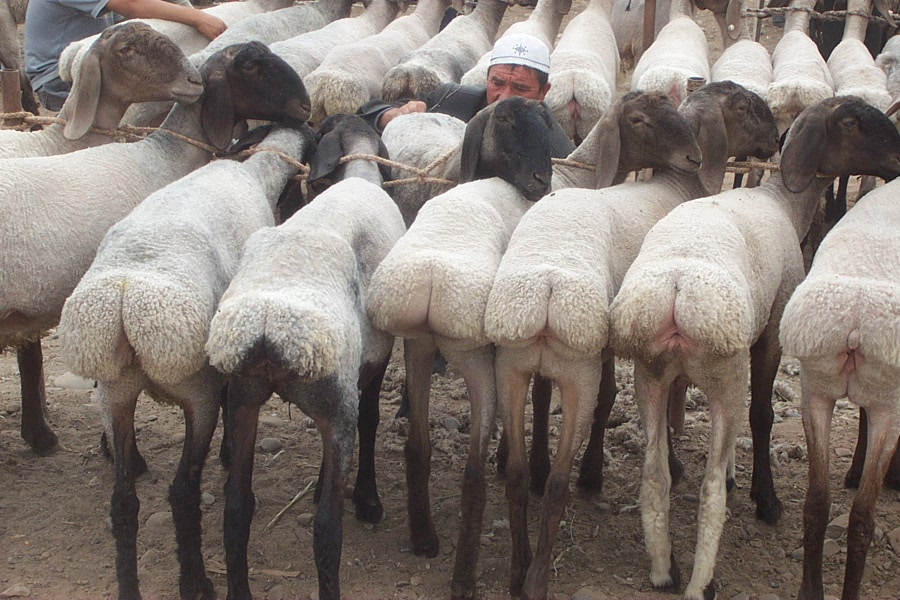
Fat-tailed sheep in Kashgar, China

Tail fat is the fat of some breeds of sheep, especially of fat-tailed sheep. It is fat accumulated in baggy deposits in the hind parts of a sheep on both sides of its tail and on the first 3–5 vertebrae of the tail. These hind parts are used to accumulate fat for subsequent use during dry seasons, similar to a camel's humps.

The rendered tail fat does not solidify at room temperature and is used in cuisine. Cracklings left after the rendering or frying of kurdyuk may be used as an appetizer. When being rendered, kurdyuk emits a strong odour, described as "acidy-poisonous". However, it has a rich flavor when ready to eat. In particular it is used to cook kofta, pilav, and other traditional dishes.

== Etymology ==
It is known under the name kurdyuk in Russian and in Central Asian languages, from the proto-Turkic *kudruk 'tail'.

Tail fat is known in Arabic as لية (leeyeh, leyyah or layeh), as zaaka in Algeria, kuyruk yağı ('tail fat') in Turkish, دنبه (donbe or dombe) in Iran, and אַלְיָה (Alya) in Hebrew, words which may be found in ancient texts as well as in local food culture and in sheep breeds' names.

== History ==
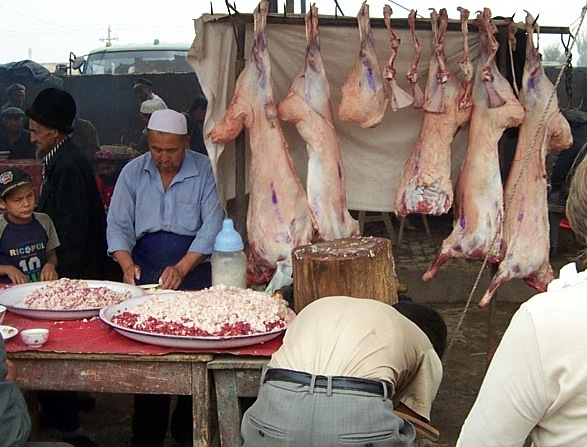
Kebab vendor in China using tail fat

Fat-tailed sheep are believed to date back to the 4th millennium BC, the earliest depiction of such sheep can be found in Uruk, 3000 BC.

According to food historian Gil Marks, tail fat was the principal cooking fat in Central Asia before the advent of modern international trade. Tail fat was mentioned as a cooking fat in several of the recipes included in the 10th-century Arabic cookbook Kitāb al-Ṭabīkh Abbasid Caliphate author Ibn Sayyar al-Warraq, the book referred to it as alya. Historian Nawal Nasrallah states that was considered an indespinsible ingredient in Iraqi cuisine until the 1960s.

According to The Oxford Companion to Food (2007), fat-tailed sheep make up 25% of the world's sheep, and is predominant in North Africa and the Mashriq region, fat-tailed sheep make up 80% of Turkey's sheep.

== Use ==
Tail fat is a core ingredient in Turkish Adana kebabı. Syrian shawarma uses tail fat as an ingredient, as well as some Palestinian and Lebanese dishes. Tail fat is a core ingredient of qawarma; spiced lamb meat preserved in tail fat. Muslims in China use tail fat as a pork substitute to comply with Islamic dietary laws.
