= Ndunglwa =

- village
- Location Nagaland, India Ndunglwa (India)
- Coordinates: 25.532941°N 93.769876°E
- Country: India
- State: Nagaland
- District: Peren
- Circle: Peren

Population (2011)
  - Total: 424
- Time zone: UTC+5:30 (IST)
- Census code: 268395

Ndunglwa is a village in the Peren district of Nagaland, India. It is located in the Peren Circle, beside Highway 129A.

== Demographics ==
According to the 2011 census of India, Ndunglwa has 106 households. The effective literacy rate (i.e. the literacy rate of population excluding children aged 6 and below) is 50%.

Demographics (2011 Census)
	Total	Male	Female
Population	424	205	219
Children aged below 6 years	118	55	63
Scheduled caste	0	0	0
Scheduled tribe	417	202	215
Literates	153	106	47
Workers (all)	287	143	144
Main workers (total)	237	121	116
Main workers: Cultivators	199	96	103
Main workers: Agricultural labourers	0	0	0
Main workers: Household industry workers	0	0	0
Main workers: Other	38	25	13
Marginal workers (total)	50	22	28
Marginal workers: Cultivators	33	16	17
Marginal workers: Agricultural labourers	0	0	0
Marginal workers: Household industry workers	0	0	0
Marginal workers: Others	17	6	11
Non-workers	137	62	75
