= Balkhi sheep =

Breed of sheep

Balkhi
- Country of origin: Afghanistan, North-west Pakistan
- Use: Meat

Traits
- Weight: Male: 70 kg (150 lb); Female: 70 kg (150 lb)
- Height: Male: 87 cm (34 in); Female: 74 cm (29 in)
- Wool color: black, tan or grey
- Horn status: Both sexes are horned

The Balkhi is a domesticated breed of sheep found in Afghanistan and north-western Pakistan. This breed is of the fat-tailed mutton type. Though this breed does grow wool, it is primarily raised for meat.

== Characteristics ==
The Balkhi displays black, tan or grey in coloration. They yield approximately 2 kg (4.4 lb) of coarse wool with an average of 43.5 micrometres in diameter. This breed has a low fiber density.

The ears are somewhat long, the body is muscular and compact. The tail is fat and tucked. Both sexes are horned.

On average at maturity, rams weigh 70 kg (150 lb) and ewes 70 kg (150 lb). Rams grow to approximately 87 cm (34 in) and ewes 74 cm (29 in) at the withers. Ewes lactate for about 105 days and produce 60 kg (130 lb) of milk on average during this period. At birth, rams weigh 5.2 kg (11 lb) and ewes weigh 3.8 kg (8.4 lb).
