= Blackheaded Somali =

Somali breed of sheep

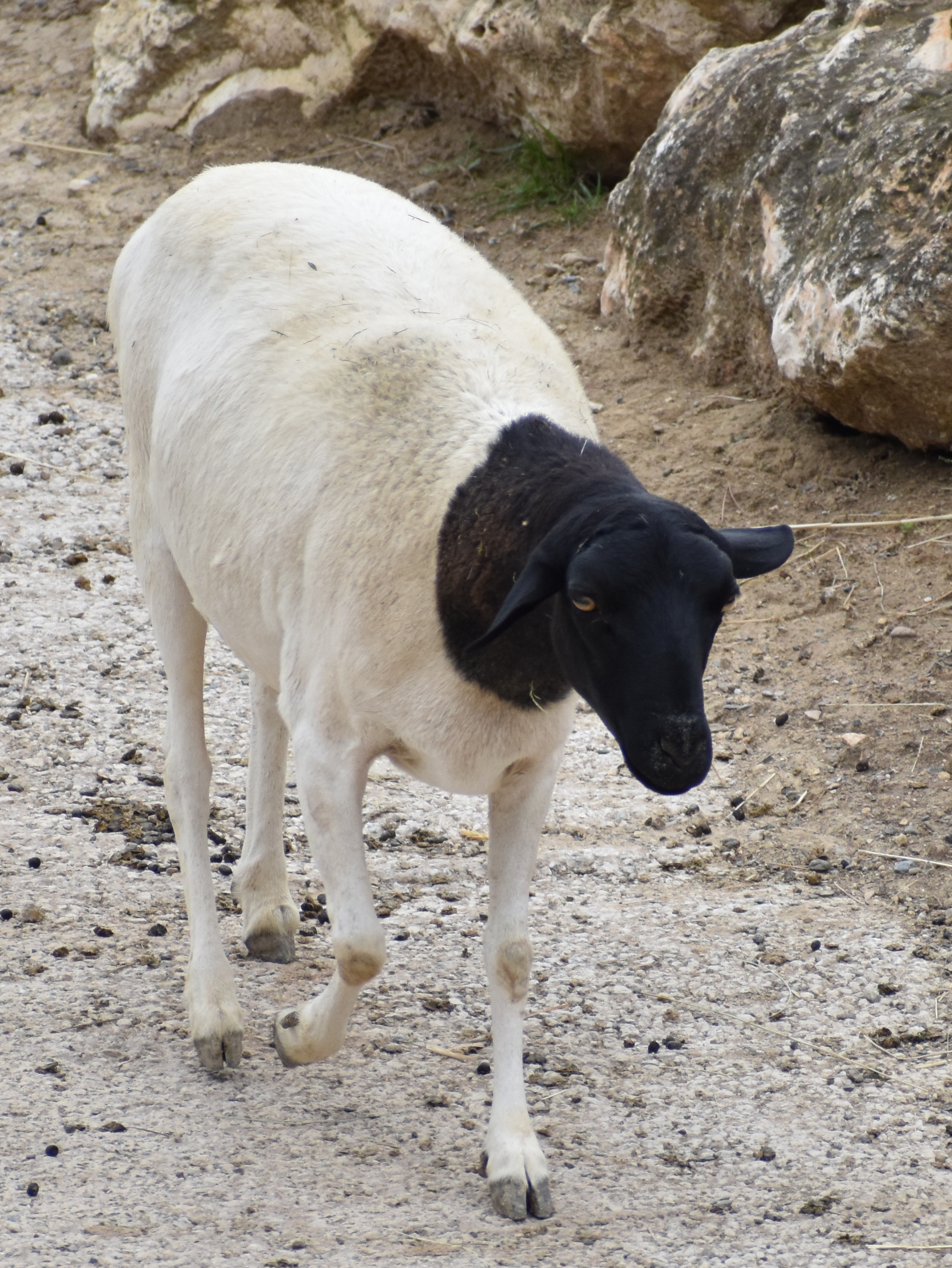
- Conservation status: FAO (2007): not at risk; DAD-IS (2026): unknown/at risk
- Other names: Somali; Berbera Blackhead; Blackhead Persian; Ogaden
- Country of origin: Somalia
- Distribution: Somalia; Djibouti; eastern Ethiopia; northern Kenya; Sudan
- Type: hair sheep

Traits
- Weight: Female: about 32 kg
- Height: Female: average 62 cm
- Hair colour: white
- Face colour: black
- Horn status: polled

The Blackheaded Somali is Somali breed of domestic sheep. It is one of two breeds of sheep reported by Somalia, the other being the Somali Arab. It is white with a black head; it is a hair sheep, is polled, and belongs to the fat-rumped group of breeds. It is distributed throughout Somalia, in Djibouti, in eastern Ethiopia, in northern Kenya and as far as the Toposa region of south-eastern South Sudan.

== History ==
The Blackheaded Persian of South Africa derives from it.

== Characteristics ==
The Blackheaded Somali is white with a black head. it is a hair sheep, is polled, and belongs to the fat-rumped group of breeds.

The animal is mainly reared for meat production and is a major export of the Somali economy, particularly to the Arabian Peninsula, via Berbera Port in Somaliland. Burco and Yirowe being home to the largest livestock markets in the Horn of Africa, with as many as 10,000 heads of sheep and goats sold daily, many of whom shipped to Gulf states via the port. The market handles livestock from all over the Horn of Africa.

== Gallery ==
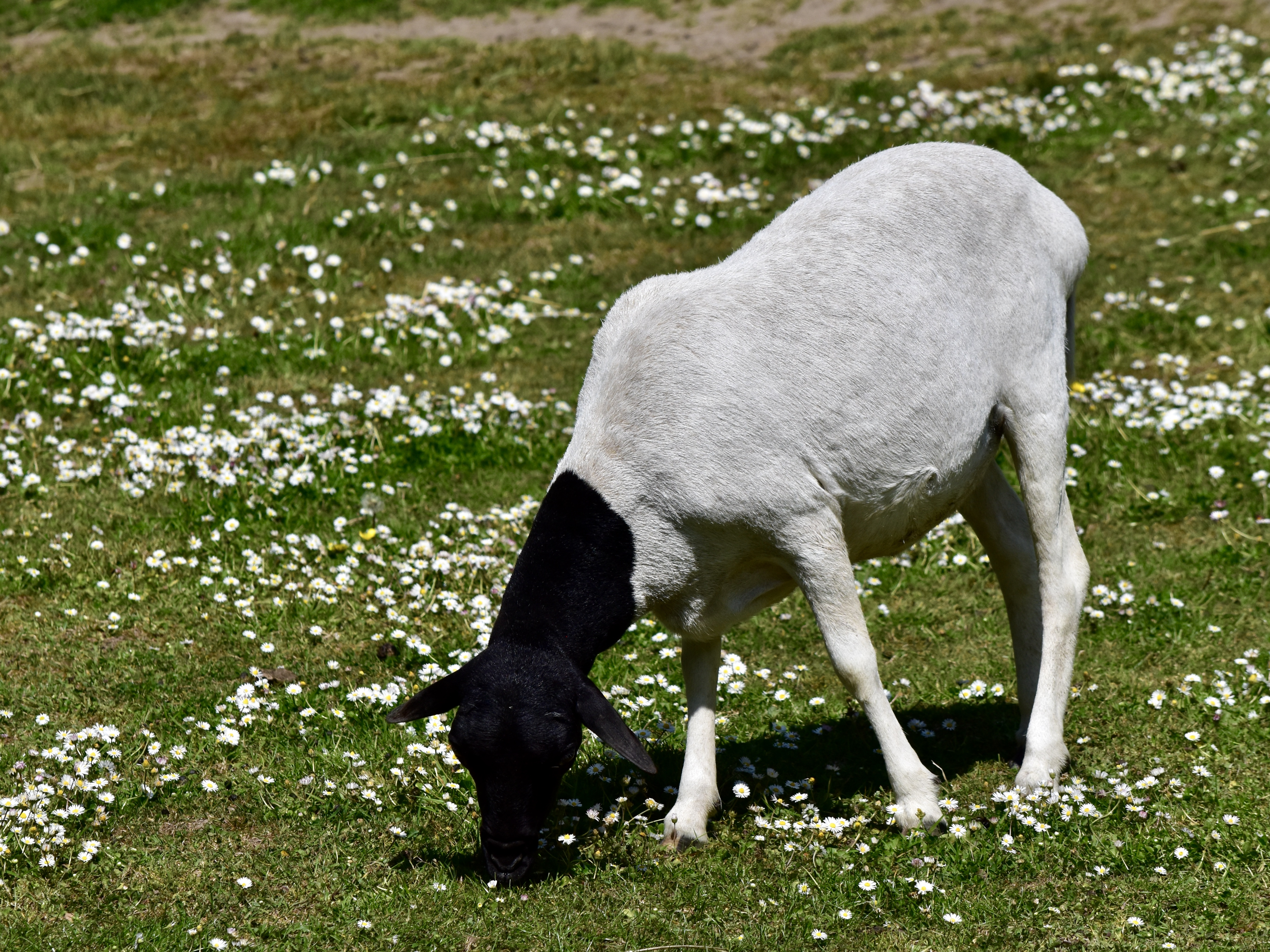
Somali sheep in Skaerup Zoo, Denmark

== See also ==
- Somali goat
