= Fat-tailed sheep =

Type of sheep

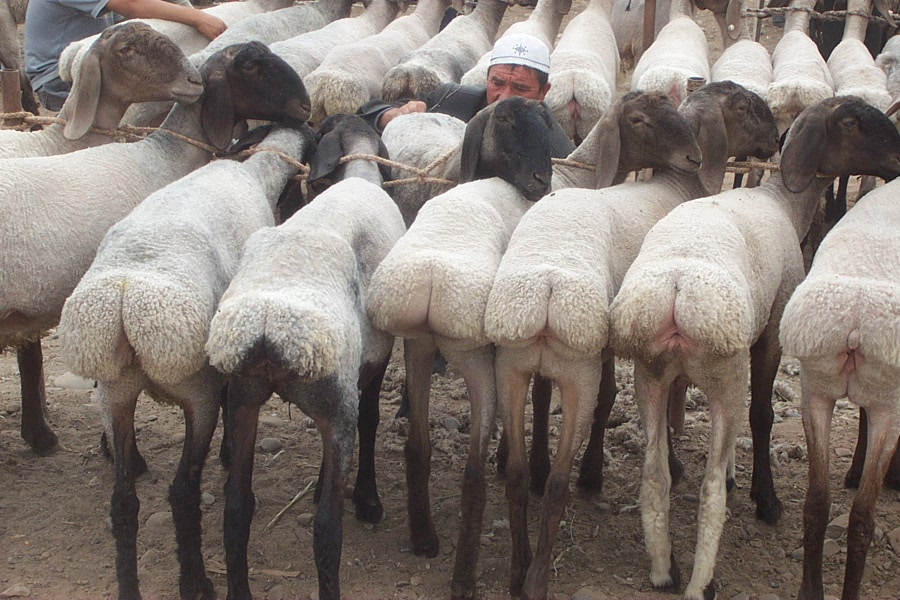
Fat-tailed sheep at a livestock market in Kashgar, China

The fat-tailed sheep is a general type of domestic sheep known for their distinctive large tails and hindquarters. Fat-tailed sheep breeds constitute approximately 25% of the world's sheep population, and are commonly found in northern parts of Africa, the Middle East, and across Central Asia to China. The tail fat from those sheep is an important ingredient in many regional cuisines.

== Varieties and distribution ==
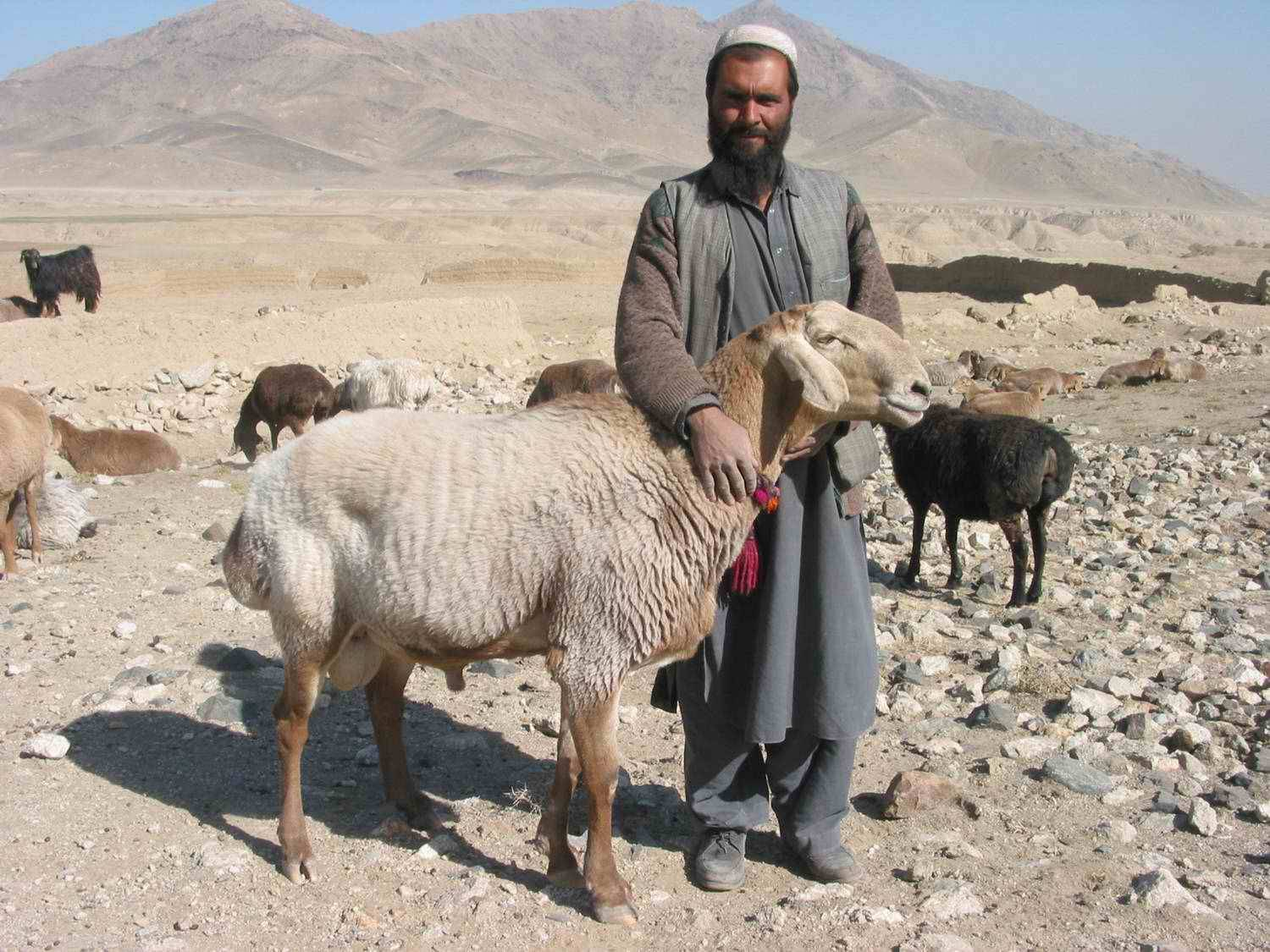
A shepherd with fat-tailed sheep on an arid plain in Afghanistan

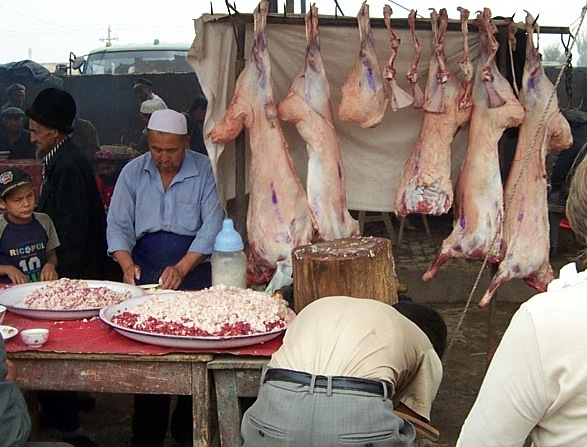
Vendor in Xinjiang, one of China's five autonomous regions, using fat-tailed sheep meat to prepare chuan

Two general varieties of fat-tails exist, the broad fat-tails and the long fat-tails. The long-tailed varieties have the smallest geographical distribution, being found mostly in Arabia (a variety called the Nejd, black with a white head, named for the Nejd region, and raised also in Iraq, Central Asia, and Syria) and in the Caucasus (the Colchian, for the Colchis territory, and the Circassian). Broad varieties include the Hajaz (Arabia, small and white, named for the Hejaz region), the Arabi (black or piebald, in Arabia and Iraq), the Awassi (the dominant variety across much of the Middle East), and the ak or White Karaman (in Turkey). Eastward, toward Iran (among the Bakhtiari people) and China, there are dozens of varieties, including the Karakul.

Fat-tailed sheep likely moved into Africa through the Horn of Africa, then into Egypt and North Africa, at least by 2000 BC, when they are depicted in Egyptian art. They were the third type of sheep to be brought into Africa.

The majority of fat-tailed sheep breeds have broad fat-tails, where the fat is accumulated in baggy deposits in the hind parts of a sheep on both sides of its tail and on the first 3–5 vertebrae of the tail. Fat-tailed sheep are well adapted to life in arid landscapes, the fat providing a food reserve for "combatting harsh desert conditions".

Ancient historians, including Herodotus, reported that the tails of these sheep were sometimes were so long that shepherds built miniature carts for them, and that they sometimes grew so large that they dragged on the ground and hindered copulation. While sometimes regarded as mythical, there are documentary accounts about the practice as late as 1837.

The earliest record of fat-tailed sheep is found in ancient Uruk (3000 BC) and Ur (2400 BC) on stone vessels and mosaics. In Sumer, fat-tailed sheep were kept in temples, for wool. Another early reference is found in the Bible (Exodus 29:22 and Leviticus 3:9), where a sacrificial offering is described which includes the tail fat (called Alyá, Hebrew: אַלְיָה) of sheep.

Mesopotamian records provide a wealth of information about fat-tailed sheep (udu gukkal or udu-gug-gal); they produced the highest-quality wool and were kept in large numbers. The city state of Lagash, around 2000 BCE, had over 66,000 such sheep.

=== Afghanistan ===
A report published in 1915 by Henry D. Baker, American consul in Bombay, indicates how important the fat-tailed sheep was for Afghanistan. The animal's wool, he says, was one of the country's most important export products; in 1912–1913 the country exported (through Balochistan) over $1.5 million in wool. Frequently fat-tailed sheep were interbred with Indian sheep to produce high-quality wool. In addition, because the fat was used in the way of butter or ghee, Afghans were able to produce a surplus of ghee for export to India. The animal's meat was the Afghan population's main meat source, according to Baker.

=== Uzbekistan ===
Uzbek cuisine is high in fat, and tail fat, called qurdiuq or dumba (often from the Karakul breed), is an important supplier of that fat, which is "revere[d] as a semi-sacred object of gastronomical desire". This fat is used in a variety of national dishes, such as laghman and palov.

Food scholar Russell Zanca notes that dumba has become scarce in the post-Soviet era. Under Soviet rule Uzbekistan became a huge grower of cotton, and consequently cottonseed oil took over as the major fat used in cooking; still, dumba continues to play an important role in the Uzbek imagination and folklore.

== Tail fat ==
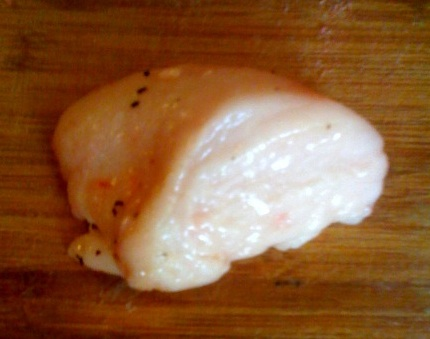
Tail fat

The tail fat is an essential part of many cuisines.

It is called لية (leeyeh, leyyah, or layeh) in Arabic, zaaka in Algeria, kuyruk yağı in Turkish, and دنبه (donbe or dombe or dumba) in Iran and Pakistan. It emits a strong smell when cooked, though the flavor is described as rich and full.

== Breeds ==
- Adal sheep
- Afghan Arabi
- Afrikaner
- Alai sheep
- Altay sheep
- Arabi sheep
- Armenian Semicoarsewool
- Awassi
- Balkhi
- Blackhead Persian
- Chios
- Damara
- Edilbay
- Karakul
- Laticauda
- Meatmaster
- Pedi
- Red Maasai
- Saryja
- Somali
- Tunis
- Tunisian Barbarin
- Waziri
- Van Rooy sheep
- Zulu, or Nguni (may be fat-tailed or not)
