= Benreu =

- village
- Location Nagaland, India Benreu (India)
- Coordinates: 25.572321°N 93.857757°E
- Country: India
- State: Nagaland
- District: Peren
- Circle: Pedi (Ngwalwa)

Population (2011)
  - Total: 850
- Time zone: UTC+5:30 (IST)
- Census code: 268299

Benreu is a village in the Peren district of Nagaland, India. It is located in the Pedi (Ngwalwa) Circle.

== Demographics ==
According to the 2011 census of India, Benreu has 180 households. The effective literacy rate (i.e. the literacy rate of population excluding children aged 6 and below) is 79.17%.

Demographics (2011 Census)
	Total	Male	Female
Population	850	435	415
Children aged below 6 years	101	52	49
Scheduled caste	0	0	0
Scheduled tribe	845	432	413
Literates	593	333	260
Workers (all)	639	332	307
Main workers (total)	189	112	77
Main workers: Cultivators	152	79	73
Main workers: Agricultural labourers	0	0	0
Main workers: Household industry workers	2	2	0
Main workers: Other	35	31	4
Marginal workers (total)	450	220	230
Marginal workers: Cultivators	179	59	120
Marginal workers: Agricultural labourers	61	52	9
Marginal workers: Household industry workers	71	34	37
Marginal workers: Others	139	75	64
Non-workers	211	103	108
