= Gaili =

- village
- Location Nagaland, India Gaili (India)
- Coordinates: 25.588146°N 93.840394°E
- Country: India
- State: Nagaland
- District: Peren
- Circle: Pedi (Ngwalwa)

Population (2011)
  - Total: 1,377
- Time zone: UTC+5:30 (IST)
- Census code: 268292

Gaili is a village under Peren district of Nagaland, India. It is located in the Pedi (Ngwalwa) Circle.

== Demographics ==
According to the 2011 census of India, Gaili has 276 households. The effective literacy rate (i.e. the literacy rate of population excluding children aged 6 and below) is 63.13%.

Demographics (2011 Census)
	Total	Male	Female
Population	1377	729	648
Children aged below 6 years	292	147	145
Scheduled caste	0	0	0
Scheduled tribe	1102	575	527
Literates	685	406	279
Workers (all)	991	525	466
Main workers (total)	408	237	171
Main workers: Cultivators	219	108	111
Main workers: Agricultural labourers	77	46	31
Main workers: Household industry workers	5	1	4
Main workers: Other	107	82	25
Marginal workers (total)	583	288	295
Marginal workers: Cultivators	84	27	57
Marginal workers: Agricultural labourers	108	61	47
Marginal workers: Household industry workers	291	135	156
Marginal workers: Others	100	65	35
Non-workers	386	204	182
