= Zulu sheep =

Breed of sheep

The Zulu sheep breed is native to South Africa and is predominantly raised by rural farmers in the province of KwaZulu-Natal. It serves primarily as a source of food and income to poor resource farmers. It belongs to the Nguni type of sheep together with the Pedi and the Swazi sheep.

== History ==
Zulu sheep are a type of Nguni breed found with the communal people of KwaZulu-Natal, South Africa. They prove a source of livelihood and means of utilising marginal environments not suitable for cultivation (Ramsey et al., 2000). Rural farmers recognise Zulu sheep for its high adaptation to the prevalent harsh environmental conditions and their ability to tolerate both external and gastro-intestinal parasites as well as tick-borne diseases. In addition they can walk longer distances and have good foraging ability (Ramsey et al., 2000). Nevertheless, the existence of the breed is threatened. Its place is being taken up by less adapted exotic breeds, either by replacement or crossbreeding. This change is being driven by the perception, held by most farmers, that indigenous livestock show poorer performance compared to their exotic counterparts. This line of thinking has been receiving political backing over the years in many African countries. Thus breeding programmes put in place in Africa have been geared towards improving this presumed low productive performance through crossbreeding.

The use of Zulu sheep in the rural locations of KwaZulu-Natal are primarily focused on the consumption of this species by the locals in the area. Another purpose of the Zulu sheep is for economic purposes. Zulu sheep can be used as a source of income or they can be used to substitute any finances that must be taken care of by the KwaZulu-Natal tribal Courts. The rural farmers that own Zulu sheep prefer them due to the superior traits of the sheep. Since the Zulu sheep have stronger immune systems, they require less medical aid which can be costly to farmers. They also require less food in their diet and have had adapted to the harsh weather conditions of KwaZulu-Natal. The quality of the meat that Zulu sheep provide is also a factor of why farmers prefer this sheep. Zulu sheep are not used by the people of the KwaZulu-Natal for any kinds of rituals. Zulu sheep are also not used in "Lobola", also known as a marital gift. The sheep serve no purpose for cultural ceremonies of any kind.

=== Extinction risk ===
Despite the strong adaptations that the Zulu sheep have, compared to other sheep, many farmers in KwaZulu-Natal adopted the idea of breeding Zulu sheep with other exotic and foreign sheep. Their main goal by cross breeding was to strengthen the various genes of the other sheep with the preferable adaptability traits and better tasting meat of the Zulu sheep. Unfortunately, farmers have started realizing that they still want to have purebred groups of Zulu sheep, but the population has decreased significantly. The extinction threat in purebred Zulu sheep is a result of the cross breeding of Zulu sheep with other sheep breeds. Some farmers have tried to make efforts to preserve the purebred Zulu sheep by inbreeding the Zulu sheep that they own. A side effect of inbreeding is that the genes of the species start to become damaged. Also, health issues arise such as weaker immune systems and shorter life spans can occur.

== Characteristics ==
Zulu sheep are smaller, multicolored sheep well adapted to being raised in the environment in KwaZulu-Natal. The appearance of the sheep varies a good deal; they feature multicolored shades of brown, black, and white wool or hair, and may be fat-tailed or not. Zulu rams may be polled or horned, and a distinguishing characteristic is that they often have exceedingly small "mouse ears". Zulu sheep are not as large or productive as meat sheep such as the Dorper, but are more resistant to external and internal parasites. Zulu sheep have three main types of colors that dominate their population. The most prevalent color is brown and is closely followed by the color combination consisting of white and brown. There is also one last color combination of black and brown that is slightly less frequent. Research has been done on the dark coloured Zulu sheep and supports a genetic process labeled "dark brown". Zulu lambs that are born nearly black possess the gene called dark-brown. This almost black coat will slowly fade to a dark-brown that is common and distinguishable among Zulu sheep herds. Zulu sheep that are purebred will be able to naturally shear their coats.

=== Health ===
Zulu sheep possess numerous adaptations that help them survive in the harsh natural conditions of KwaZulu-Natal. Scientific studies have shown minute negative impacts to the physical health of the Zulu sheep. This can be credited towards the increased immune system of the Zulu sheep and their ability to survive off a smaller diet than that of other sheep in KwaZulu-Natal. Research had also found out that mortality percentages for the Zulu lambs is almost one third. This statistic was found by scientist after surveying local KwaZulu-Natal farmers who stated the mortality of lambs around 4 to 12 months of age.

=== Care ===
The farmers of the Zulu sheep attempt to use their knowledge of different indigenous learnings to help them care for the livestock. Some KwaZulu-Natal farmers will use certain foliage and plants native to the land to help elevate the amount of reproduction the Zulu sheep will have during breeding. The two main sources of feed for Zulu sheep are maize and hay.
