= Australian White sheep =

Australian breed of sheep

Australian White
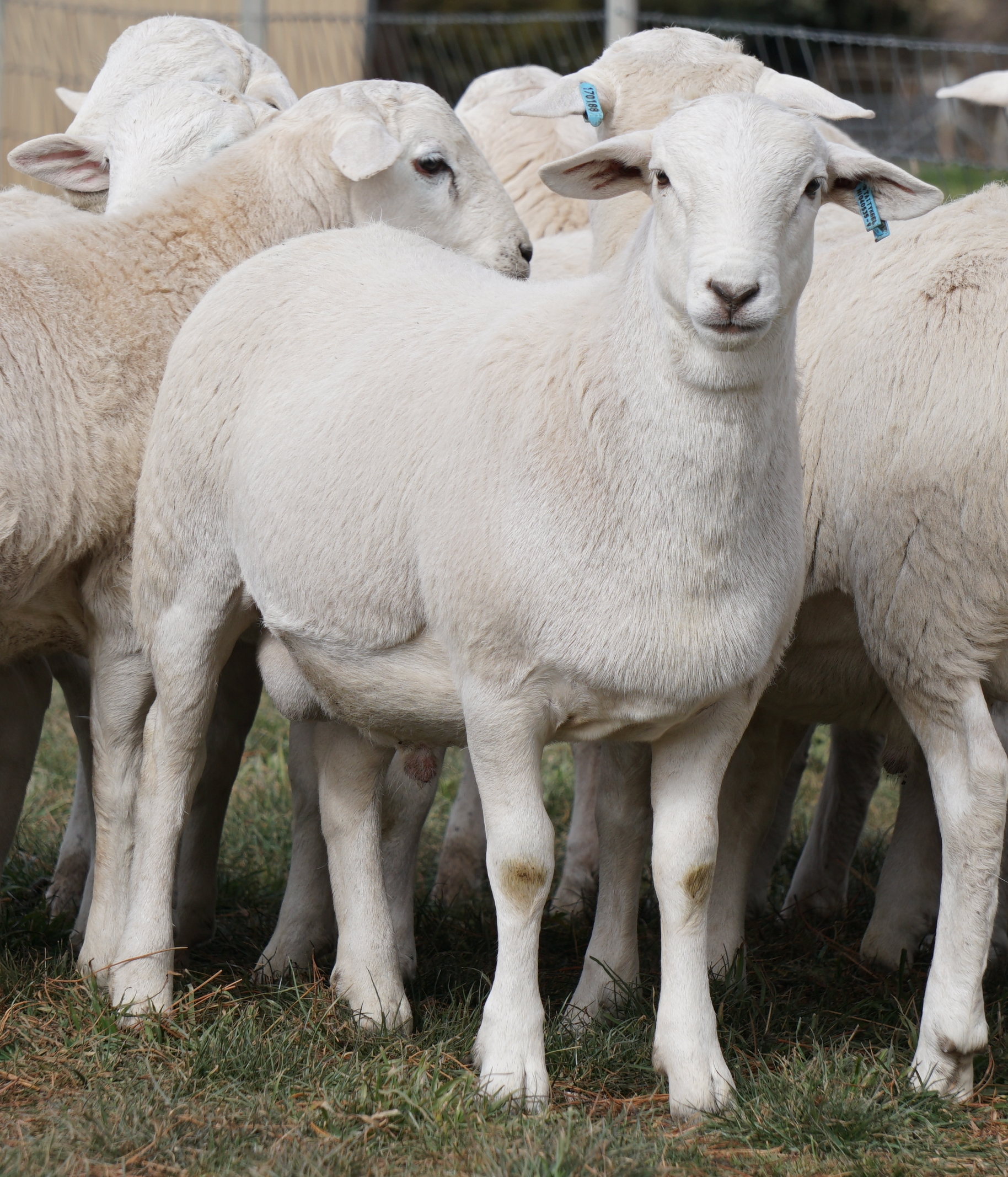
- Lambs aged 14 weeks
- Country of origin: Australia
- Standard: National Australian White Sheep Society
- Use: meat
- Hair colour: white

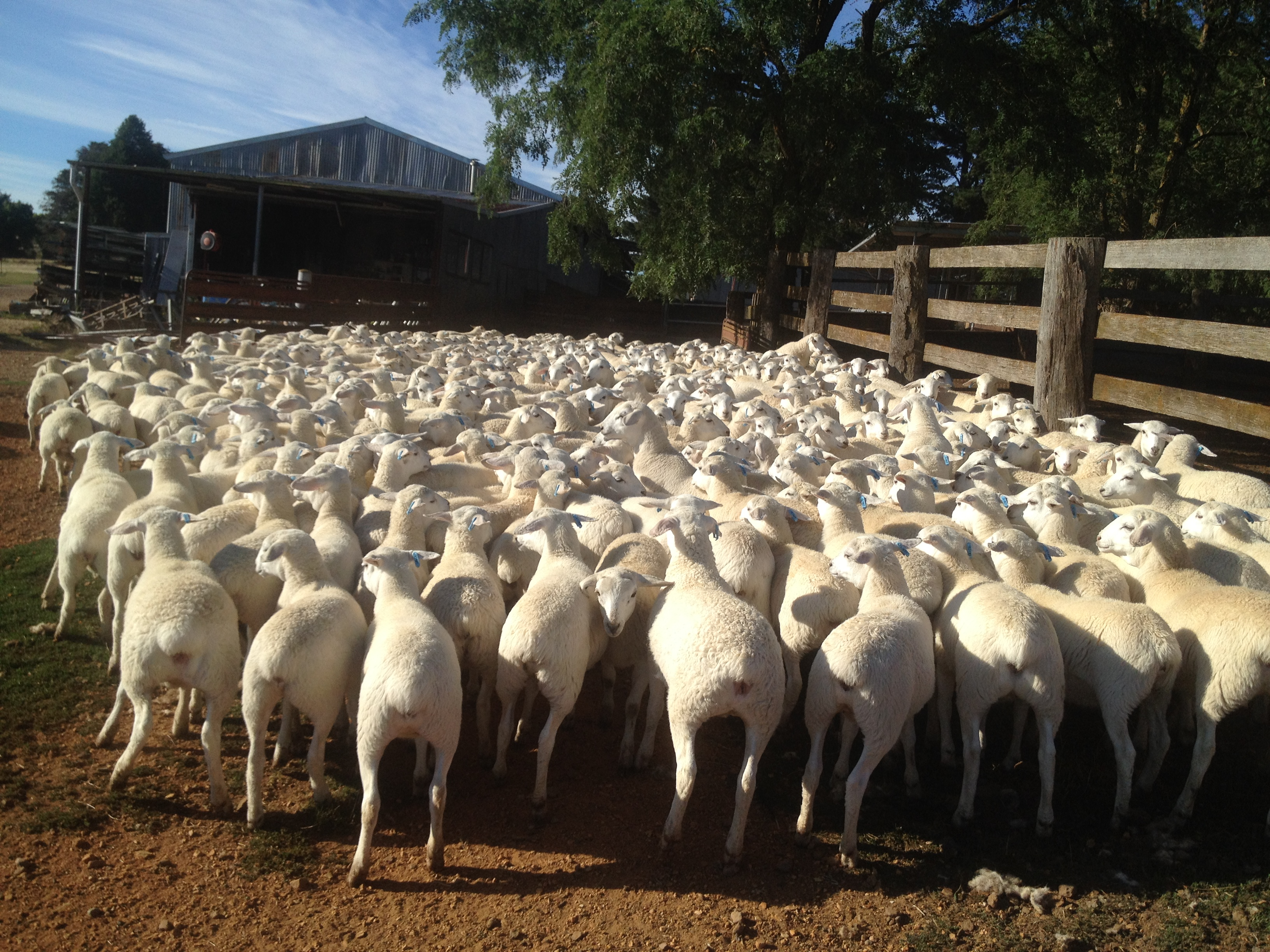
Young flock of ewe lambs

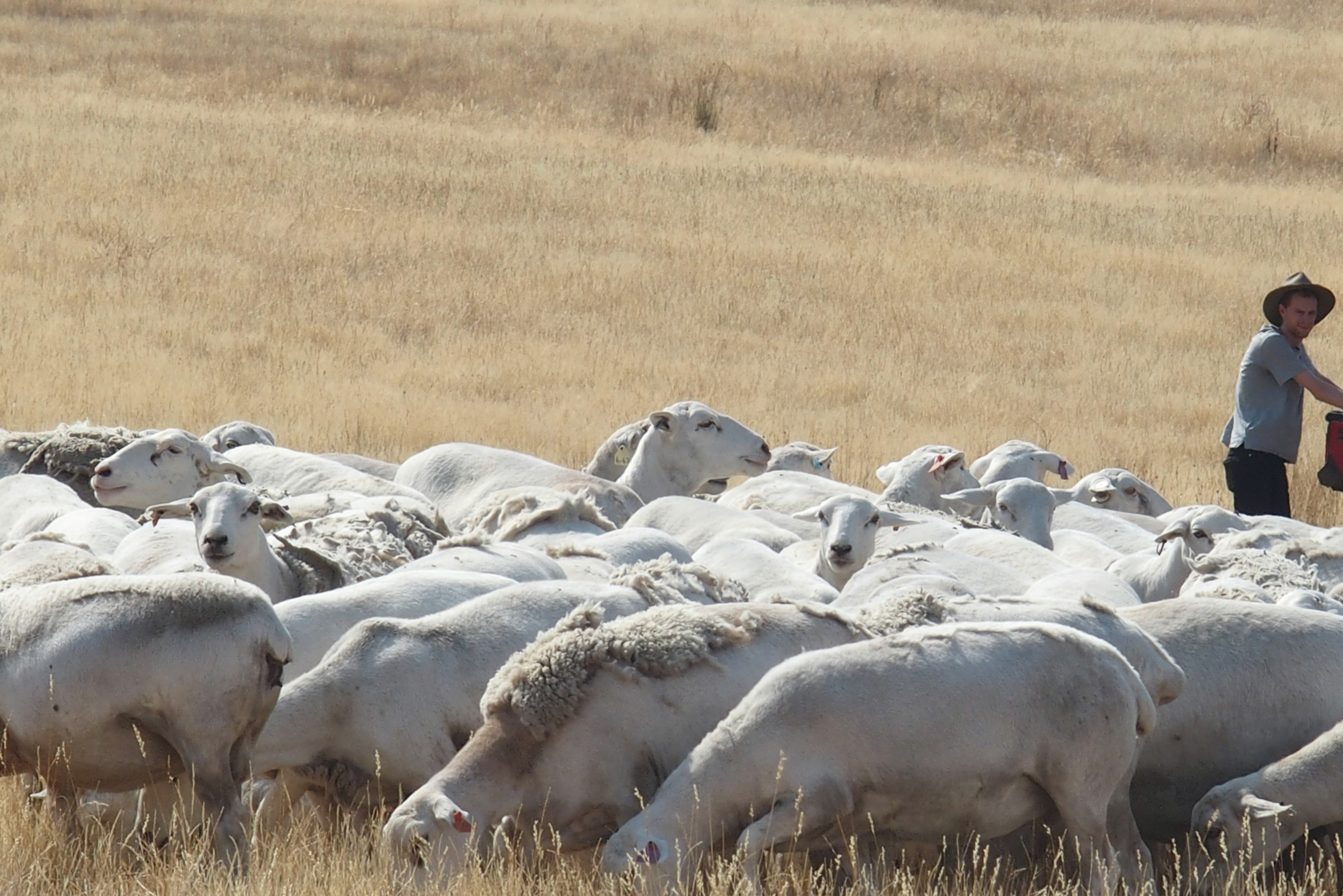
Flock in Mudgegonga, Victoria, Australia

The Australian White is an Australian breed of meat sheep. It derives from selective breeding of White Dorper, Van Rooy, Poll Dorset and Texel sheep, with the aim of creating a large white sheep suited to Australian conditions, and with a self-shedding hair coat.

== History ==
Three breeders – Baringa, Highveld and Tattykeel - collaborated to create the breed.

In 2011 the Australian White sheep breed was shown at the Sydney Royal Easter Show for the first time.

In 2019 the breed was introduced into the USA.

In 2022 an Australian White ram was sold for AU$240,000, thought to be a record price for a meat sheep.
