= Pedi, Peren =

Pedi
- village
- Location Nagaland, India Pedi (India)
- Coordinates: 25.563262°N 93.811055°E
- Country: India
- State: Nagaland
- District: Peren
- Circle: Pedi (Ngwalwa)

Population (2011)
  - Total: 85
- Time zone: UTC+5:30 (IST)
- Census code: 268297

Pedi is a village in the Peren district of Nagaland, India. It is located in the Pedi (Ngwalwa) Circle.

== Demographics ==
According to the 2011 census of India, Pedi has 20 households. The effective literacy rate (i.e. the literacy rate of population excluding children aged 6 and below) is 61.76%.

Demographics (2011 Census)
	Total	Male	Female
Population	85	49	36
Children aged below 6 years	17	8	9
Scheduled caste	0	0	0
Scheduled tribe	76	44	32
Literates	42	28	14
Workers (all)	57	32	25
Main workers (total)	25	13	12
Main workers: Cultivators	23	12	11
Main workers: Agricultural labourers	0	0	0
Main workers: Household industry workers	0	0	0
Main workers: Other	2	1	1
Marginal workers (total)	32	19	13
Marginal workers: Cultivators	16	6	10
Marginal workers: Agricultural labourers	6	4	2
Marginal workers: Household industry workers	9	9	0
Marginal workers: Others	1	0	1
Non-workers	28	17	11
