= Dorper =

Breed of sheep

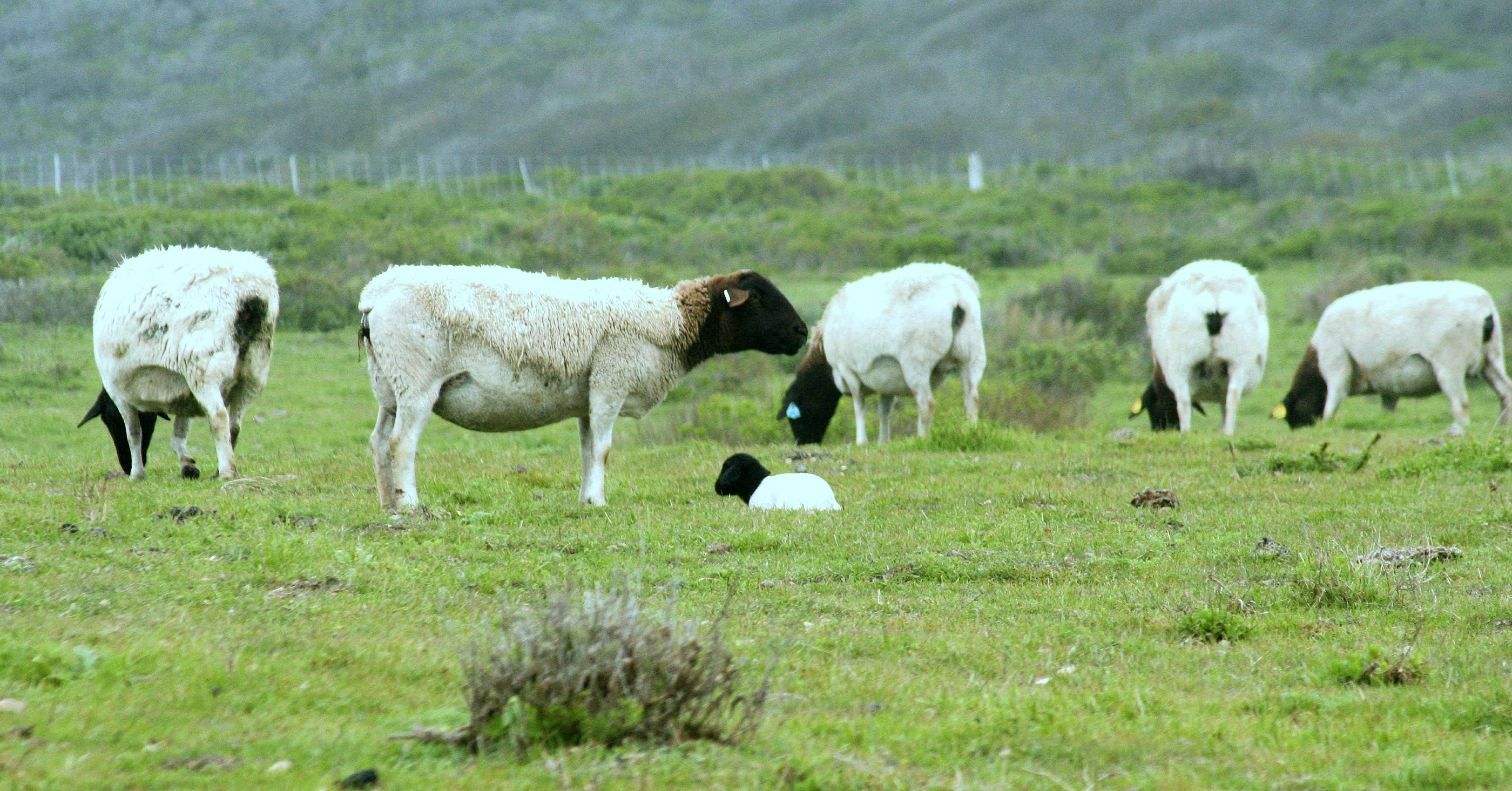
- A Dorper flock
- Conservation status: Common
- Country of origin: South Africa

Traits
- Wool color: Mainly white, some black
- Face color: Black

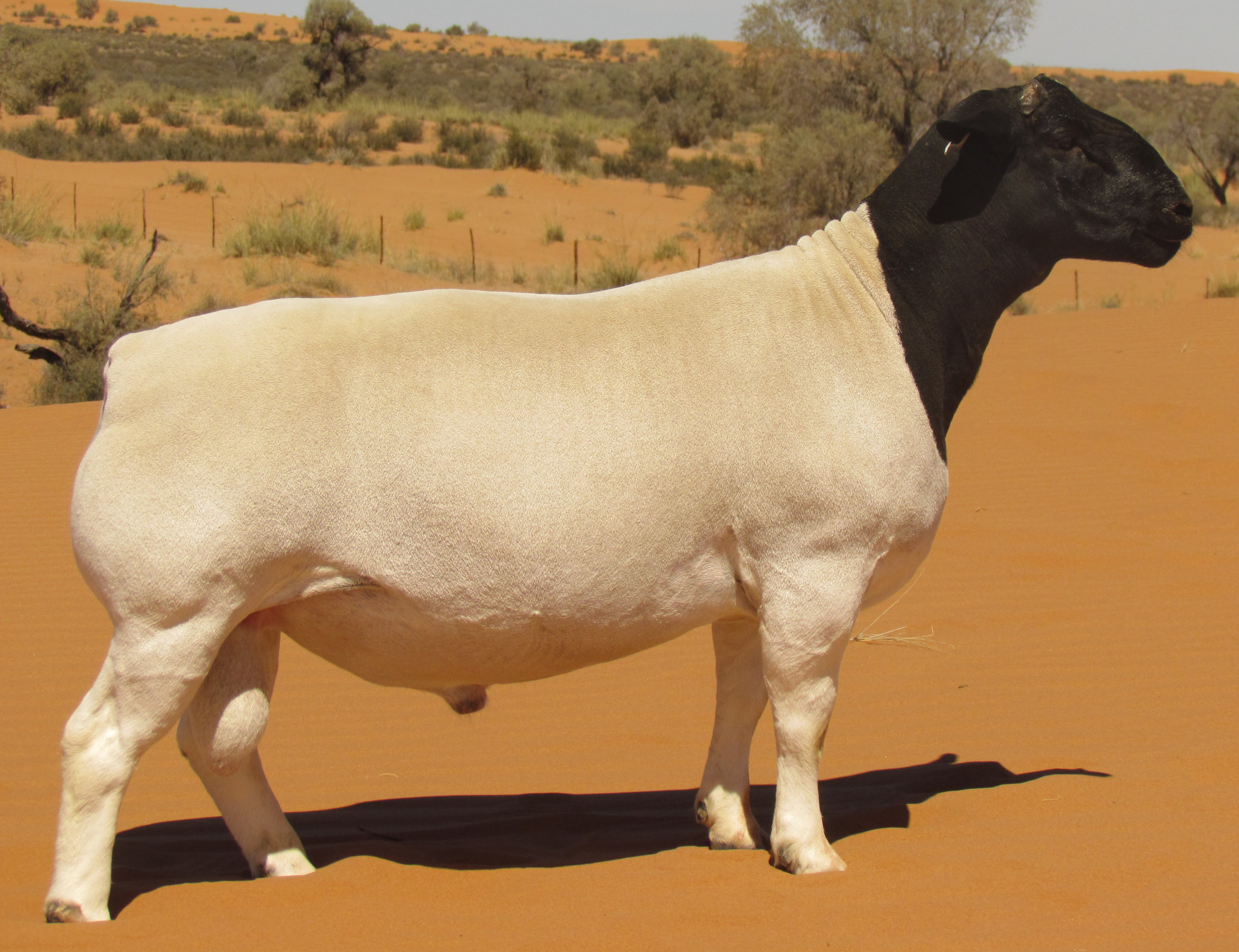
Dorper ram - South Africa

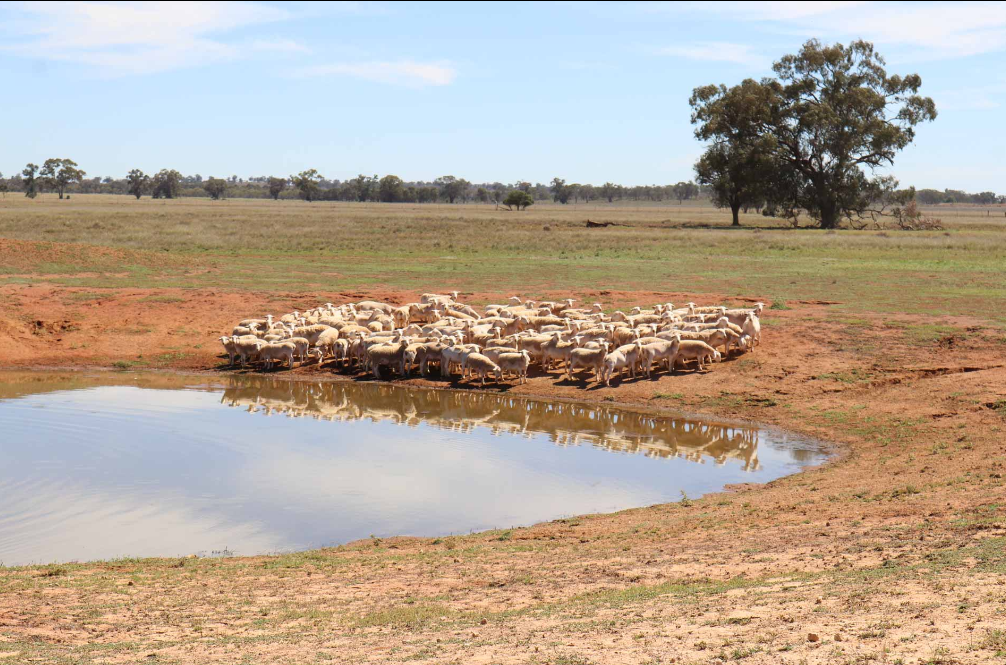
Australian mob of white Dorpers

The Dorper is a South African breed of domestic sheep developed by crossing Dorset Horn and the Blackhead Persian sheep. The breed was created through the efforts of the South African Department of Agriculture to breed a meat sheep suitable to the more arid regions of the country. It is now farmed in other areas as well, and is the second most common sheep breed in South Africa.

== Uses ==
The Dorper is a fast-growing meat-producing sheep. The Dorper is an easy-care animal that produces a short, light coat of wool and hair that is shed in late spring and summer. It was developed in South Africa and is now the second most popular breed in that country. The Dorper Sheep Breeders Society of South Africa was founded in 1950.

This breed was developed by the crossing of a Dorset Horn x Blackhead Persian around the 1930s. Other breeds such as the Van Rooy are also believed to have contributed to the development of the White Dorper breed. The name 'Dorper' is a coupling of the first syllables of the parent breeds Dorset and Blackhead Persian.

The breed is well adapted to survive in the arid extensive regions of South Africa. It has high fertility and maternal instinct, combined with high growth rates and hardiness. The breed has the characteristic black head.

The Dorper is the second largest breed in South Africa and has spread to many other countries throughout the world.

Lambing percentages in South Africa of 150% are not uncommon, as well as an average fecundity of 160%. Rams reach sexual maturity at an early age; rams have been observed to start working by five months. Live weight gains that allow lambs to reach about 36 kg (79 lb) (17 kg (37 lb) - 18 kg (39 lb) carcase) in 100 days has been obtained from first cross animals grown in the Mallee region. Local experience indicates that carcasses with fat scores of 2 to 3 are easily obtained under these conditions.

White Dorper genetics have also contributed to the development of the Australian White sheep breed.

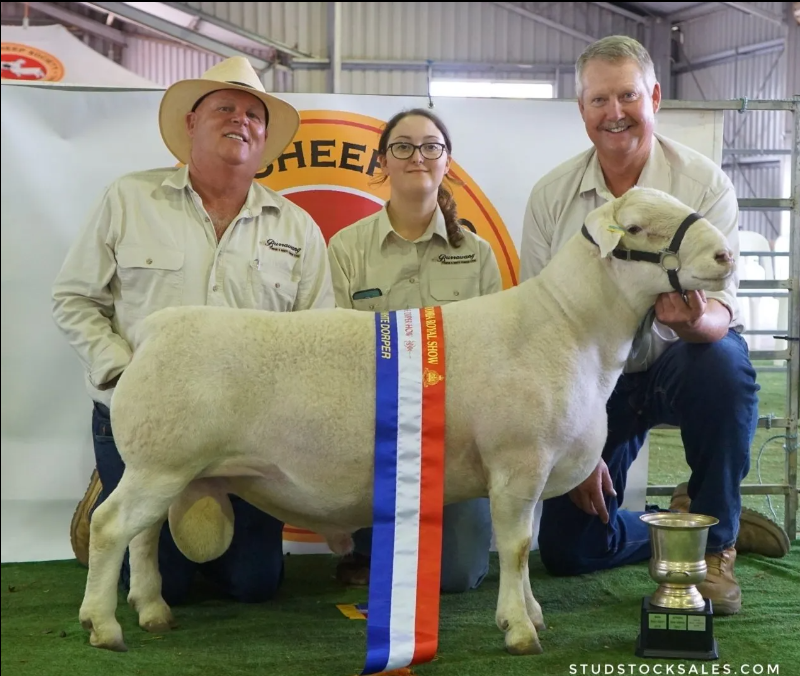
Big Australian white Dorper ram

== Physical characteristics ==
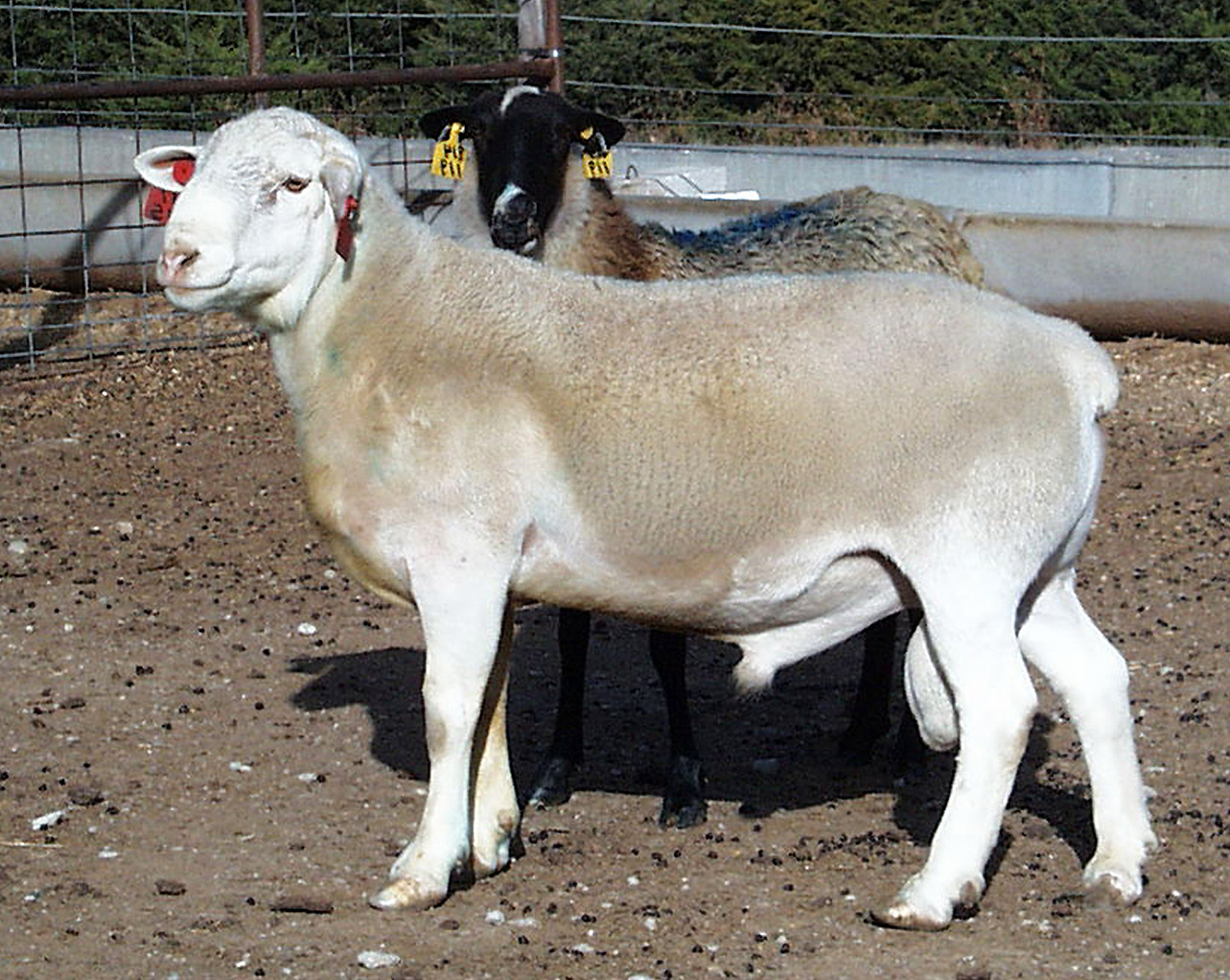
A white-headed Dorper ram (with Romanov ewe in the background)

The Dorper adapts well to a variety of grazing conditions. In its native South Africa it has spread from the arid areas to all parts of the republic. It reputably does well in various range and feeding conditions and is also suited to intensive feeding. In Australia, Dorpers are now farmed throughout the arid and tropical areas as well as the high rainfall southern states, thriving even in the extreme cold and wetness of Tasmania. Dorpers can be run as a replacement or with suitable management as a complementary flock to Merinos, particularly as shearing costs continue to rise.

== Husbandry ==
The breed is extremely adaptable with a high ability to flourish, grow, produce and reproduce in irregular and low rainfall environments. Dorpers are known to adapt well to feed lot conditions which offers farmers an alternative method to finish lambs in times of drought. The breed is regarded as having the ability to graze and browse which suggests it will consume plants seldom eaten by the Merino.

The Dorper is an easy-care breed which requires minimal input of labour. The Dorper has a thick skin, which is highly prized and protects the sheep under harsh climatic conditions. The Dorper skin is the most sought-after sheepskin in the world and is marketed under the name of Cape Glovers. The skin comprises a high percentage of the income (20%) in South Africa. Unlike Merinos, Dorpers do not need shearing, crutching, or mulesing, and they are much less prone to flystrike.
