= Assaf sheep =

Breed of sheep

Assaf
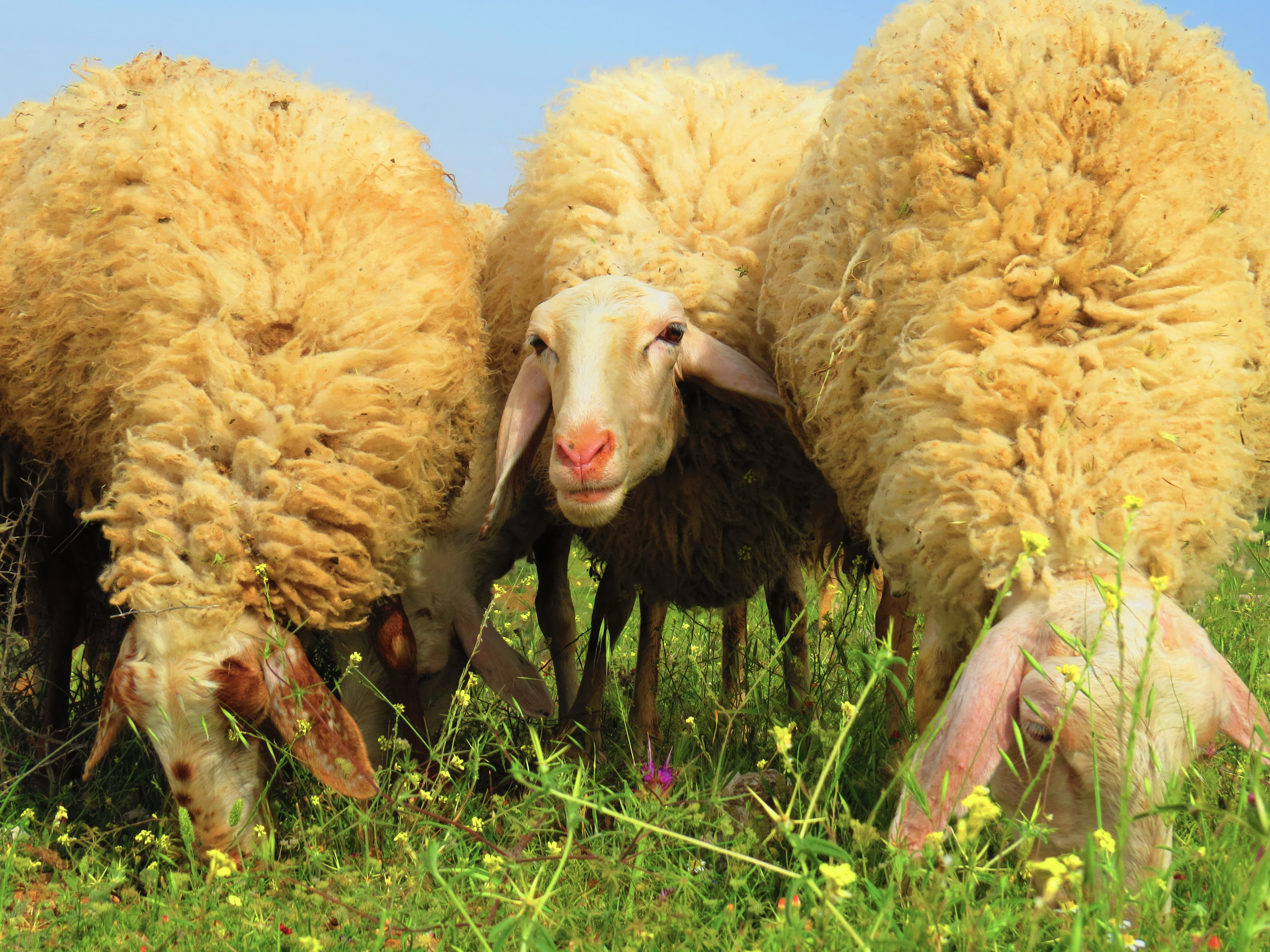
- Country of origin: Israel
- Use: Meat, milk

Traits
- Wool color: White
- Face color: White

Assaf is a breed of domesticated sheep from Israel. The Assaf sheep is the product of crossbreeding the Awassi and East Friesian.

The Assaf is a dual purpose breed, raised for both milk and meat. Both sexes display white and are unicolored.

== See also ==
- Agricultural research in Israel
- Sheep husbandry
- Agriculture in Israel
