= Damara sheep =

Namibian breed of sheep

Damara
- Conservation status: FAO (2007): not at risk; DAD-IS (2022): at risk
- Country of origin: Namibia; South Africa
- Standard: Damara Sheep Breeders' Society of South Africa
- Type: Fat-tailed
- Hair colour: solid black, brown or white; or black-and-white pied

The Damara is a Namibian breed of fat-tailed hair sheep, also found in South Africa. The name derives from that of the Damara region of northern Namibia where it is principally found, particularly in the Kaokoveld Desert. Together with the Namaqua Afrikaner and the Ronderib Afrikaner, it is one of three breeds in the Afrikaner group of sheep that were already in southern Africa before the arrival of colonists, and which forms part of the broader African Long-fat-tailed sheep grouping. It may be solid black, brown or white, or black-and-white pied.
