= Pedi sheep =

Breed of sheep

The Pedi sheep is a breed of sheep native to South Africa. And is one of three of indigenous type of sheep, along with Zulu and Swazi, they have been in the region since 200-400 AD. The breed gets its name and characteristics from having been raised primarily by the Pedi people in the north of the country. Pedi are smaller fat-tailed sheep kept for meat, are polled, and are generally white, brown, and red.
