= Sheep farming in New Zealand =

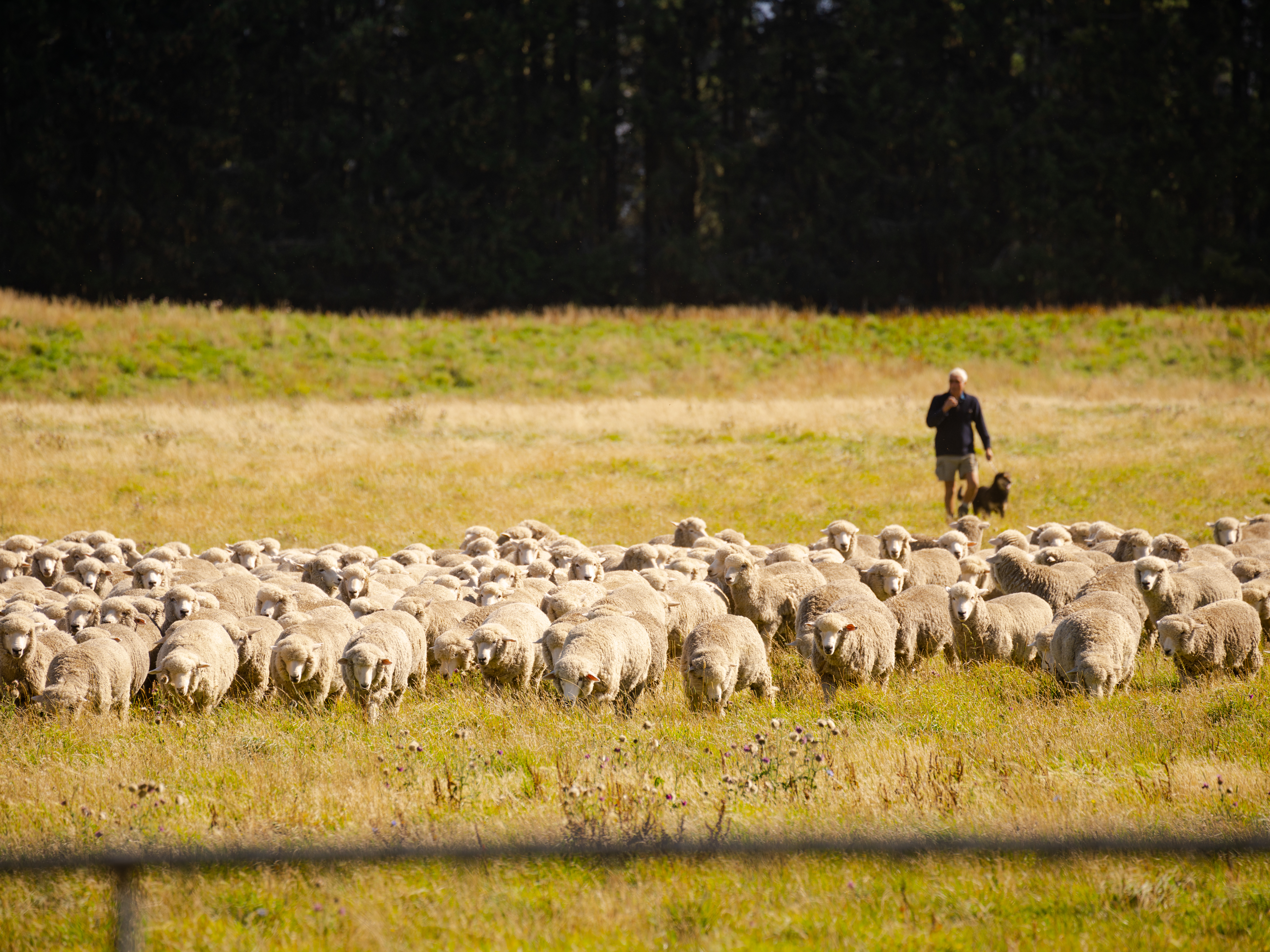
Sheep and farmer near Ashburton

Sheep farming is a significant industry in New Zealand. According to 2007 figures reported by the Food and Agriculture Organization (FAO) of the United Nations, there are 39 million sheep in the country (a count of about 10 per human). The country has the highest density of sheep per unit area in the world. For 130 years, sheep farming was the country's most important agricultural industry, but it was overtaken by dairy farming in 1987. Sheep numbers peaked in New Zealand in 1982 to 70 million, but have dropped to about 24.4 million as of June 2023. There are 16,000 sheep and beef farms in the country which has made the country the world's largest exporter of lambs, with 24 million finished lambs recorded every year.

== History ==
Sheep were introduced into New Zealand between 1773 and 1777 with credit to James Cook, the British explorer. Samuel Marsden, a missionary, introduced some flocks of sheep to the Bay of Islands, and then also farmed in Mana Island close to Wellington for the purpose of feeding the whalers. The period between 1856 and 1987 was a bonanza period for sheep farming, resulting in economic prosperity of the country.

=== 19th century ===
Johnny Jones was an early settler in Otago. When the whaling boom ended, he switched to farming in 1840. He was the first Pākehā who settled large numbers of immigrants on the east coast of the South Island, and he imported sheep amongst other stock for this purpose. One of the first to bring substantial numbers of sheep to Canterbury was John Deans in 1843. As was usual at the time, the sheep were bought in Australia. John Cracroft Wilson's endeavours of setting up as a sheep farmer in 1854 demonstrate the hardship that early settlers and stock often faced. He had a disastrous journey from Sydney where much of his stock died and 1,200 sheep had to be jettisoned. After landing in Lyttelton, his stock was transferred to the nearby Gollans Bay (the bay in Lyttelton Harbour beneath Evans Pass), where he lost more stock to tutu poisoning and cold southerly winds.

Whilst John Acland and Charles George Tripp arrived in Canterbury in 1855, only four years after organised settlement of Canterbury began, all the suitable land on the Canterbury Plains had already been taken up. They were the first to take up land in the Canterbury high country for sheep farming.

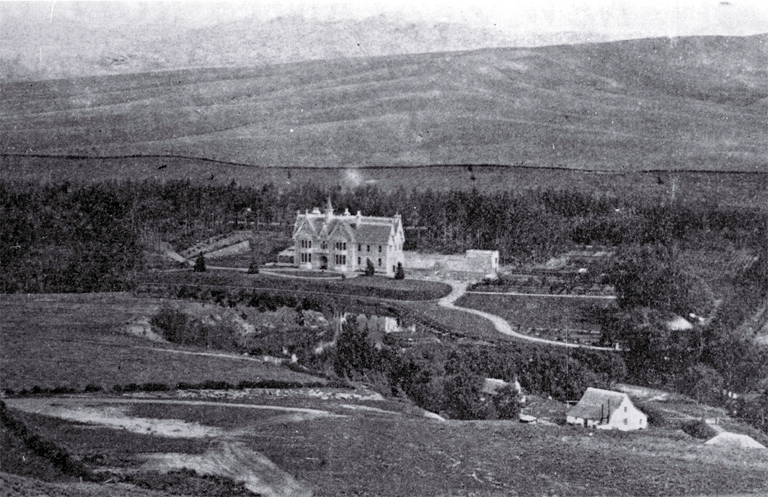
Glenmark mansion in the late 1880s, built for George Henry Moore, which served to demonstrate its owner's extreme wealth

George Henry Moore established himself in North Canterbury. His Glenmark Station was for a time New Zealand's largest sheep run, and his daughter established the Christchurch tourist attraction Mona Vale with her inheritance. His biography says of him:

Moore stands out in New Zealand pastoral history as a supremely successful runholder in terms of personal wealth. His skill, judgement and sense of timing were of a very high order. Yet without strong financial backing from partners and bank, the full achievement of Glenmark would have been impossible. His 1873 purchase was a bold decision, based on a mortgage of exceptional size to the Union Bank of Australia, which advanced Moore £90,000. The link between banking and large runholding in Canterbury was never more clearly demonstrated.

=== 20th century ===
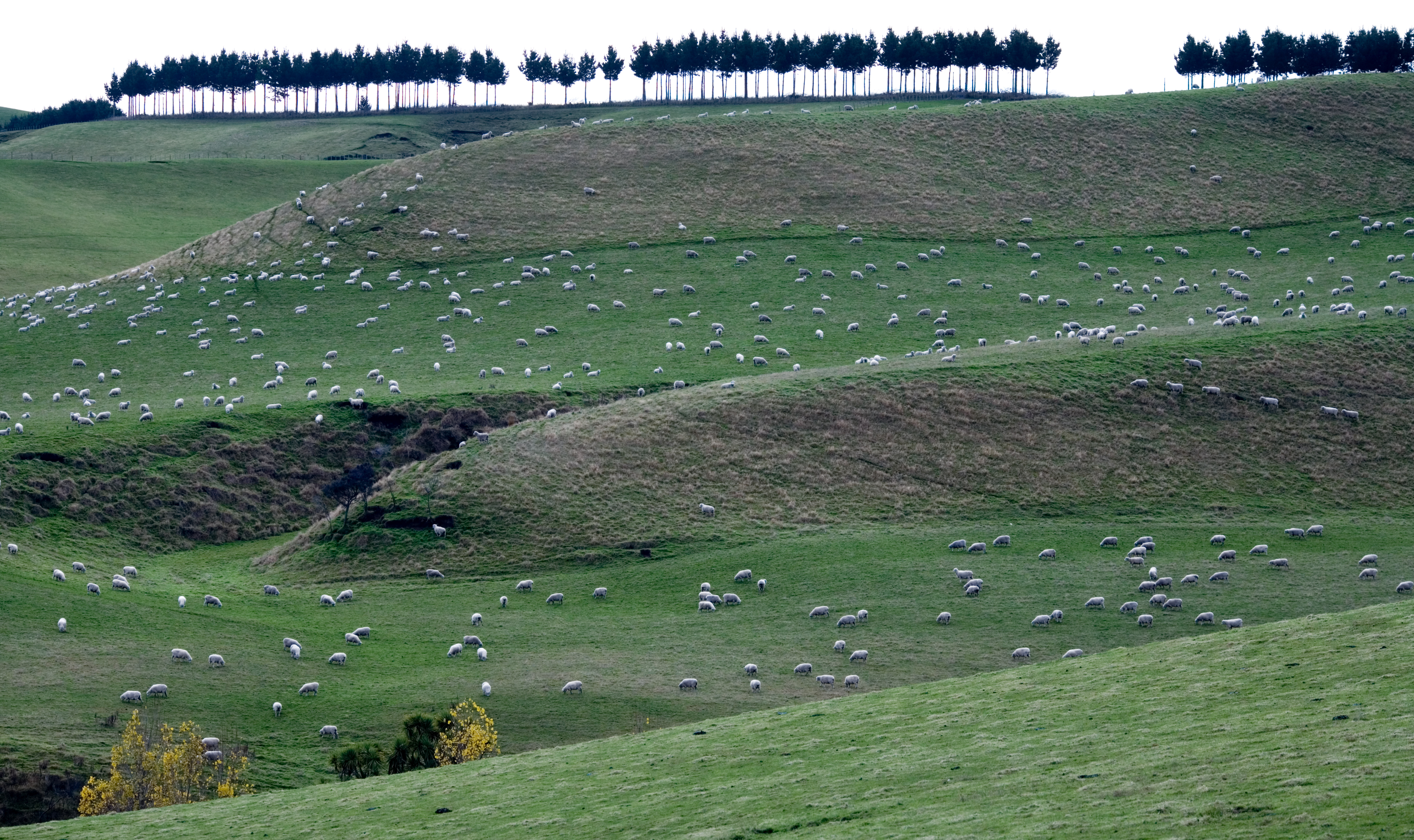
Landscape 'carpeted' with sheep

New Zealand flocks rarely numbered less than 400 head. The total area of occupied land was under 45 million acres. Of this, 5 million acres supported from 1 to 8 sheep per acre for the year, while over 9 million acres averaged from one-half to 2 sheep per acre. Grass was the principal crop. With a growing season of 10 months and well-distributed rainfall, it was profitable to keep grass for stock. Nearly half of the occupied land was in holdings of over 5,000 acres, mainly used for sheep. There were 90 holdings of over 50,000 acres each while 18,694 holdings were from 50 to 200 acres. The number of sheep increased from about 19 million in 1896 to 24,595,405 in 1914. The average flock size increased from 1,081 in 1896 to 1,124 in 1913. About half the sheep were in flocks which numbered less than 2,500 while seven-eights of them were in flocks numbering over 500 head each. Wethers, rams, and ewes under breeding age comprised about one-half the sheep.

The most successful breed raised in the early 19th century was the Spanish breed of Merino. It was bred on the South Island for many years. The Merino ewe furnished the foundation of a cross-bred stock. In the early days of the Canterbury Region meat trade, the English Leicester breed was the favourite ram for breeding with the Merino ewe. Later, the Lincoln breed was used to cross with the Merino, and black-faced rams were put to the cross-bred ewes. In the North Island, the Romney sheep was better suited with the moist climate and became the most popular sheep; it also increased in numbers in the South Island. The Lincoln and Border-Leicester were favoured in both islands, while the Southdown displaced other breeds for fat-lamb production throughout New Zealand. The Leicesters, mainly the English variety, were the most popular British breed in the South Island.

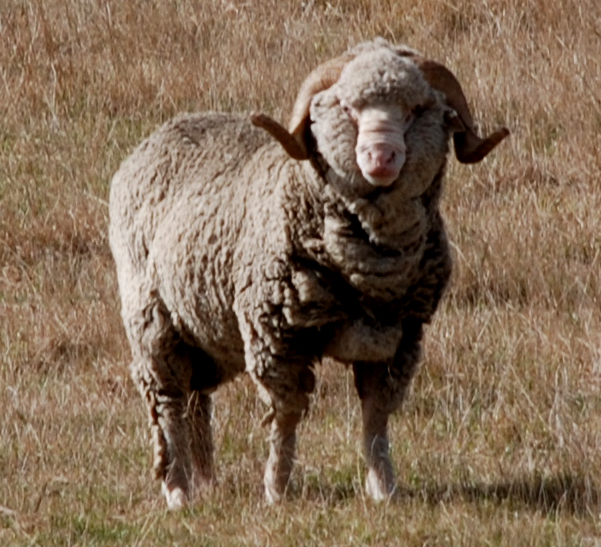
Merino sheep

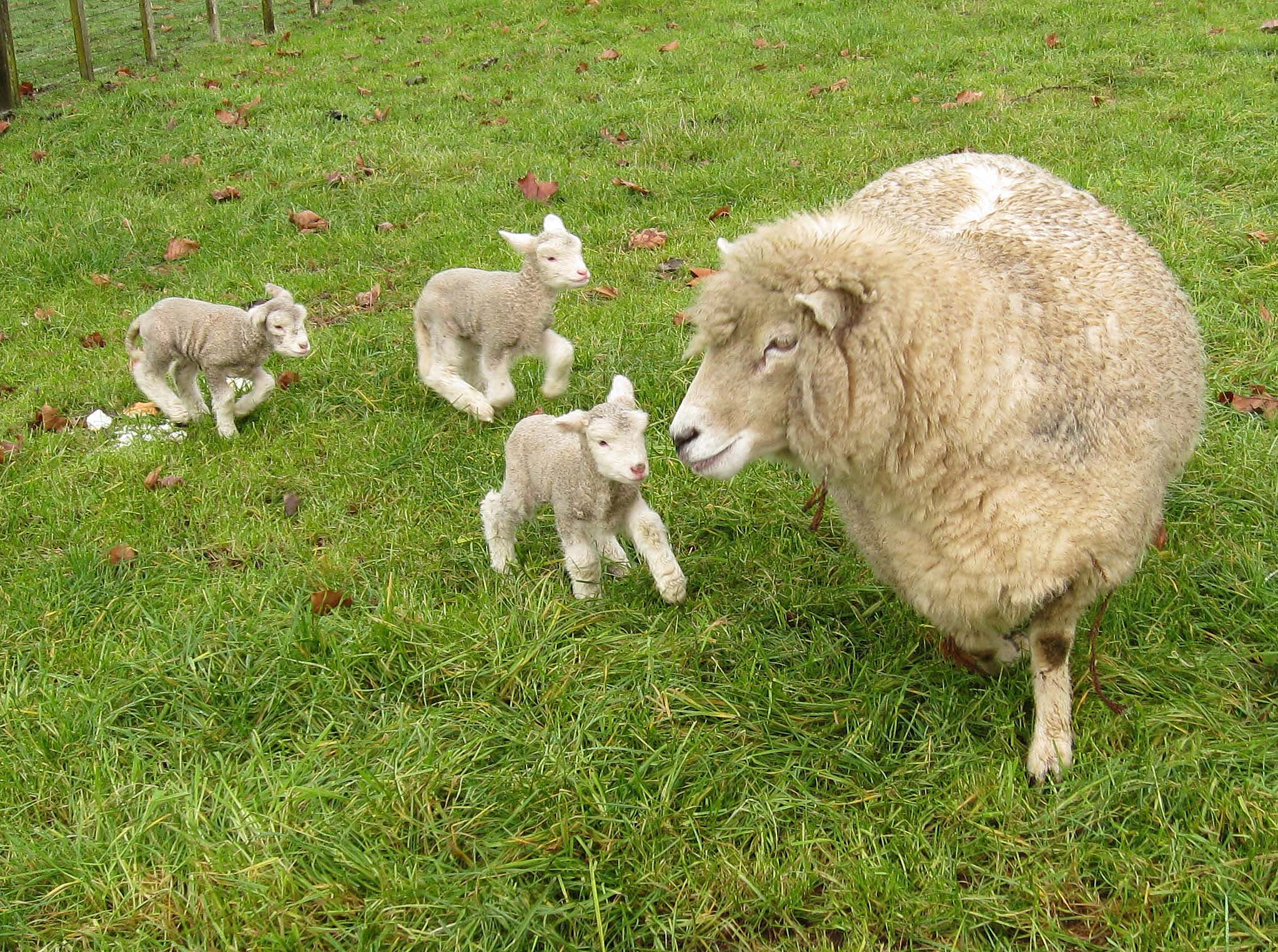
Romney ewe with triplet lambs

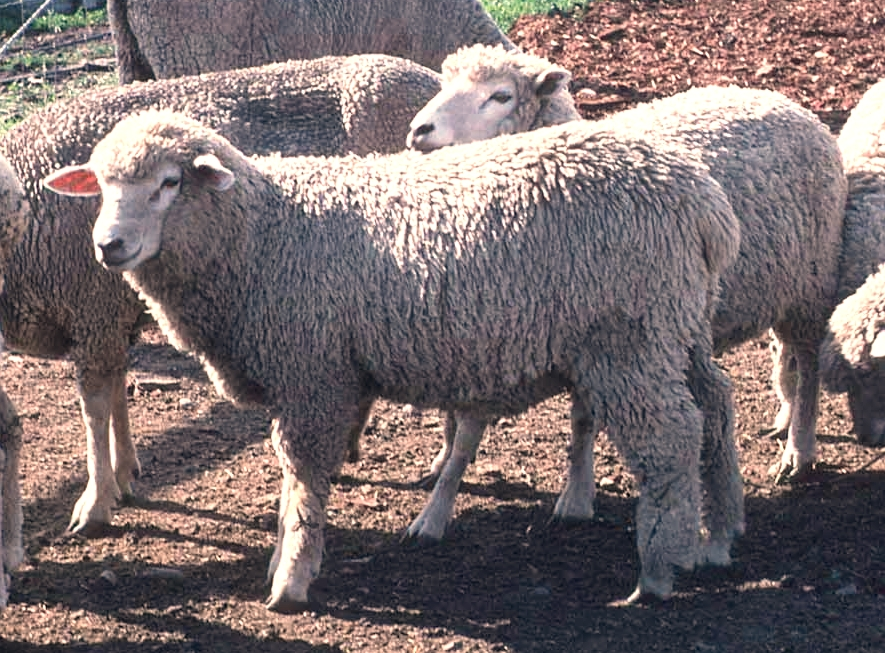
Corriedale sheep

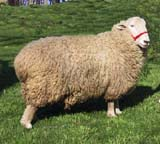
Coopworth sheep

The development of sheep farming in New Zealand in the first half of the 20th century brought increased competition to sheep farmers in southern Patagonia who were struggling with a drop in traffic as result of the opening of Panama Canal and mounting social unrest.

The sheep population reached a peak of 70 million in 1982 but soon there was a sharp decline as the dairy industry overshadowed it. In 1987, the sheep population was only about 39 million; this fall is also attributed to withdrawal of government subsidy to this sector. In spite of a decline in the population of sheep in New Zealand, the hilly areas of the country have seen a proliferation of sheep farming in the decades since the late 1960s. This growth is on account of introduction of better species of pasture vegetation, use of pesticides and weed control, regulated and systematic paddock management of farms, and introduction of better and disease resistant breeds of sheep. Under a wide mosaic of varying climatic and soil conditions, and the large extent of farms have resulted in development of a wide range of industries.

=== 21st century ===
In the first quarter of the 21st century, sheep farming has continued its steady decline in New Zealand, impacted by reduced demand for both wool and mutton in Asia, the conversion of land to forestry, and specifically the conversion of land to carbon forestry, by which farmers have been able to earn a reliable stream of revenue from carbon offset programs.

As of 2007, New Zealand had approximately 39 million sheep, nearly 10 sheep for every person in the country (the 2006 human population was 4,027,947), placed in sixth position among the most populous sheep farming countries of the world. In June 2015, sheep numbers were at 29.1 million. A year later, numbers had fallen by 1.5 million to 27.6 million. In 2023, the ratio of sheep to humans had fallen below five to one for the first time since records began in the late 1850s. According to national data, the sheep population had dropped to 25.3 million in June 2022, with New Zealand's population reaching 5.15 million. New Zealand was still ahead of Australia, which then had three sheep to one Australian. As of June 2024, there were 23.3 million sheep in the country, as forestry continued to take on more acreage and a drought necessitated extra reduction in flock sizes.

== Breeds ==
The New Zealand Sheepbreeders Association is responsible for managing sheep breeding in the country and also stud breeding in sheep industry. It ensures the purity of created breeds, with a good pedigree and a notable record of performance. The developed breeds reported by the associations are: Border Leicester, Borderdale, Corriedale, Dorper, Dorset Down, East Friesian, English Leicester, Finnsheep, Hampshire, Lincoln, Oxford, Poll Dorset & Dorset Horn, Polwarth, Ryeland, Shropshire, South Suffolk, Suffolk, and Texel. Breeding variety included the Corriedale, a cross breed of the Merino and English breeds; New Zealand Romney, which accounts for nearly 66% of all sheep in the country now, and its wool is suitable for making carpets; Perendale, which is adaptable to all types of weather and provides good meat and wool; and Coopworth, in a well tended farmland, this breed has good meat and wool value. An annual event of the New Zealand Ewe Hogget Competition was initiated by George Fletcher to encourage and appreciate quality breeding of sheep. The event was held in May 2013 and awards were presented for Technology & Innovation, Best Woolled Flock, Large Flock and Flock Performance.

== Farming development ==
In the initial years the large farms which came into existence were for sheep brought from Australia to Wairarapa, farms in the Canterbury Plains, and Otago farm, and land leased from the ethnic Māori. In later years, land was leased from the government in the eastern part of South Island, a dry area found suitable to establish large farms for Merinos for increased production of wool. In the northern Island, sheep farms in lands owned by Māori were under a much lower growth trajectory as the vegetative cover of bushes and wet weather conditions were not conducive for the Merinos to survive.

== Trade ==
The first trading of sheep meat was with Britain when frozen meat was exported in 1882. Subsequently, with large expansion of sheep farms, this export trade has sustained the economy of the country substantially. New Zealand's major agricultural export commodity was wool during the late 19th century. Even in the late 1960s it accounted for over a third of all export revenues. but as its price has steadily dropped relative to other commodities wool is no longer profitable for many farmers.

== See also ==
- Integrated sheep-vineyard system
