= Drysdale sheep =

New Zealand breed of sheep

Drysdale
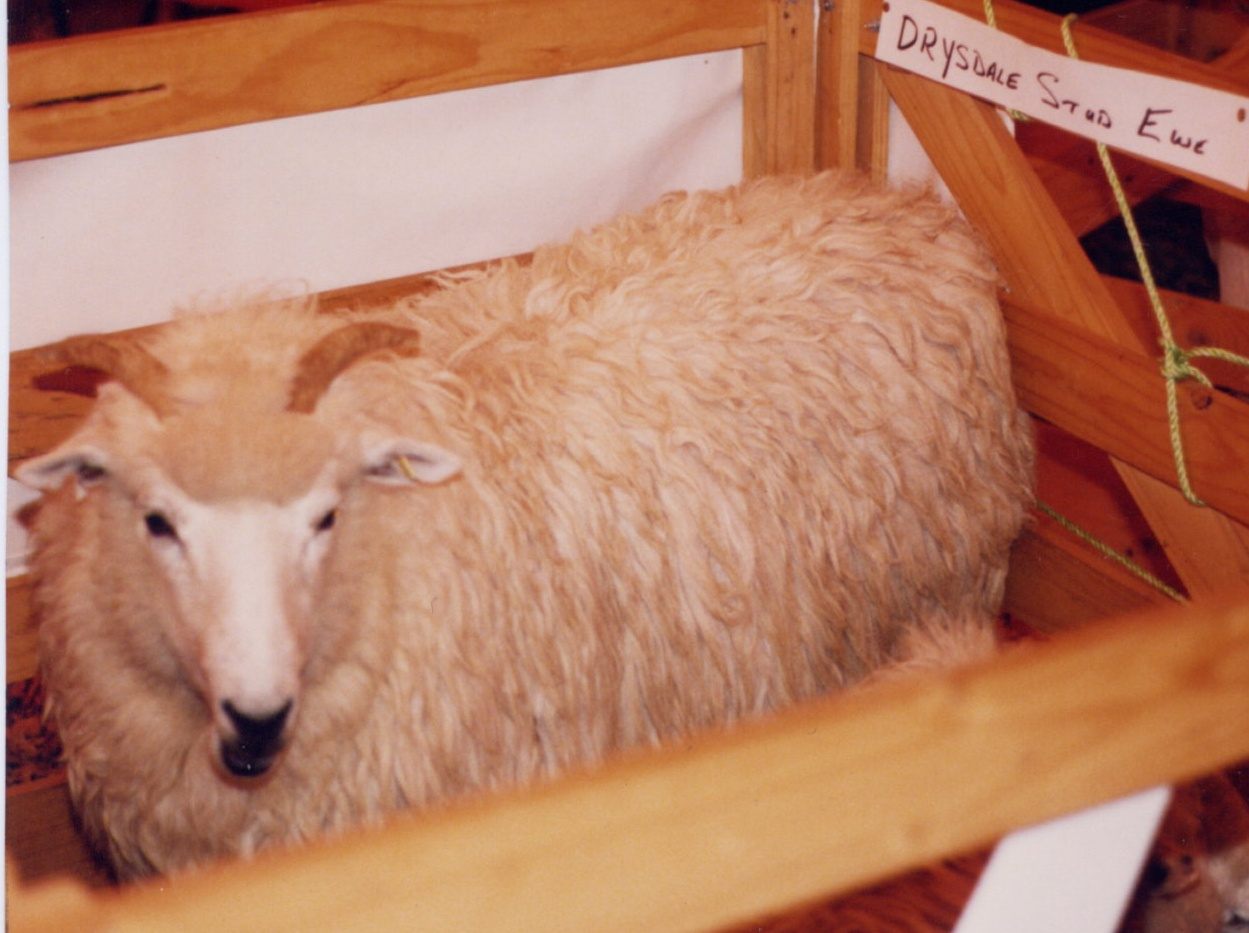
- Conservation status: FAO (2007): endangered; DAD-IS (2021): unknown
- Country of origin: New Zealand
- Use: carpet wool; meat

Traits
- Weight: Male: 75–100 kg; Female: 55–70 kg
- Wool colour: white
- Face colour: white

The Drysdale is a New Zealand breed of sheep. It was developed from 1931 by Francis Dry, and derives from sheep of the New Zealand Romney breed in which a mutation caused the coat to be particularly hairy, and thus suitable for carpet-making. It is a specialised carpet wool breed, but also a useful meat breed.

In the twenty-first century it is a gravely endangered breed, with no recorded animals in New Zealand and thirty sheep in one flock in Australia.

== History ==
From 1929 Francis Dry, of Massey Agricultural College near Palmerston North, conducted research into the occasional hairiness of sheep in general, and specifically in sheep of the New Zealand Romney breed. In 1931 he received the gift of an unusually hairy Romney lamb from a nearby station; the genetic basis for this hairiness – the dominant N^{d} gene – was established in or before 1940. The Drysdale breed descends from hairy animals in the research stock of the college. The wool was found to be particularly suitable for carpet-making, and was much in demand. The sheep became widespread in New Zealand, where at one point the total population may have reached 600000 head. Stock was exported to Australia from 1975, and a breed society, the Australian Drysdale Sheep Breeders' Association, was established in 1979; by 2003 the number of ewes put to Drysdale rams was over 10000 per year, and there were more than 300 Drysdale breeders.

In the twenty-first century it is a gravely endangered breed: in New Zealand in 2006 there were two registered breeders, and in 2010 there were no recorded animals; in Australia in 2022 there was one flock, consisting of thirty ewes and four rams.

== Characteristics ==
It is of medium to large size, with body weights of 55 to 70 kg for ewes and 75 to 100 kg for rams. Both the face and the fleece are uniformly white; the legs and face are free of wool.

Although the New Zealand Romney, the parent breed, is invariably polled, the Drysdale is usually horned, this because of a link between the hairiness gene and the hornedness gene. Animals homozygous for the hairiness gene are horned regardless of sex, while in heterozygous animals ewes are generally polled, and rams always horned.

== Use ==
The Drysdale was bred for its coarse hairy wool, which was found to be particularly suitable for carpet-making. It is one of four specialised carpet-wool breeds in New Zealand, the others being the Carpetmaster, the Elliotdale and the Tukidale; all derived either from the New Zealand Romney or from the Perendale.

The sheep are shorn twice-yearly. Fleeces weigh from 5 to 7 kg; the wool is coarse and highly medullated, but low in kemp. The staple length is in the range 100 to 150 mm, and the average fibre diameter is 40 μm (equivalent to a Bradford Count of 35s–45s).
