= Romney sheep =

Sheep breed

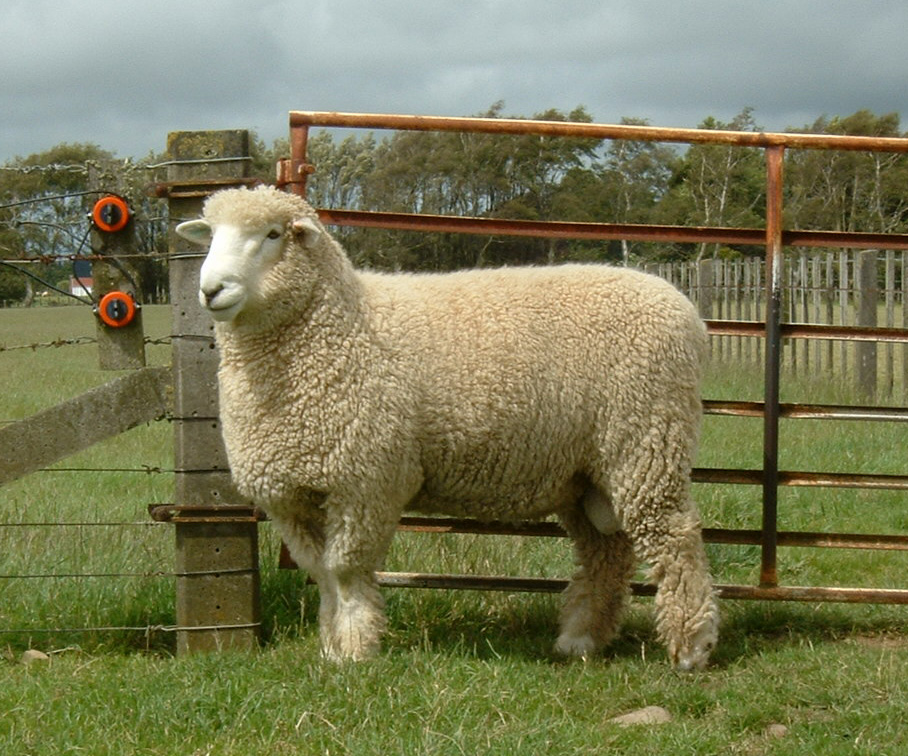
- Country of origin: England
- Use: Wool, meat

Traits
- Weight: Male: 92 kg; Female: 70 kg
- Height: Male: 75 cm; Female: 71 cm

The Romney, formerly called the Romney Marsh sheep but generally referred to by the local farmers as the Kent, is a breed of sheep originating in Kent, England. The breed developed from a native European white-faced, long-tailed sheep. The Romney has developed to survive the harsh conditions of marshy wetlands.

== History ==
Sheep, breeds and management (1893)

The breed evolved from medieval long-wool types, of which the Romney and Leicester breeds are early examples. The first record of sheep keeping in Romney Marsh dates back to a charter in 697 or 712 AD. The breed was recognised as "Romney Marsh" or "Kent" in 1800, and Romney's fleece quality and body shape were improved by cross-breeding with Bakewell's English Leicester. In 1896, the Romney became recognised as a pedigree breed.

=== Exports ===
The first confirmed export was from England to New Zealand in 1853. The shipment was of 16 ewes and 4 rams from Kent aboard the Cornwall. In 1872, the Romney was first introduced to Australia. The same year, the breed was imported from England to North America by William Riddell and Sons of Monmouth in Oregon. Between 1900 and 1955, 18,000 rams and 9,000 ewes were exported from England to 43 other countries. The breed has been established in places such as Patagonia, Australia, Portugal, Brazil, Canada, and Southern California.

== Attributes ==
In a distribution survey in 2009, most of the Romney sheep population was concentrated in a 65 km (40 mile) radius in South East England. Found in the lowlands of South East England, they are farmed for both meat and wool. The Romney is in general an open-faced breed with long wool that grows over the legs in full. Romney breed standards are not identical across all countries, but have much in common. The oldest Romney breed society, that of England (founded 1895), adopted the following standard in 1991:

Head wide, level between ears, with no horns nor dark hair on the poll. Eyes should be large, bright and prominent and the mouth sound. Face in ewes full, and in rams broad and masculine in appearance. Nose and hooves should be black. Neck well set in at the shoulders, strong and not too long. Shoulders well put in and level with the back. Chest wide and deep. Back straight and long, with a wide and deep loin. Rump wide, long and well-turned. Tail set almost even with the chine. Thighs well let down and developed. The face should be white, and the skin of a clean pink colour. Ribs should be well sprung. Legs well set, with good bone and sound feet. Sheep should stand well on their pasterns. The fleece should be of white colour, even texture and a good decided staple from top of head to end of tail and free from kemp.

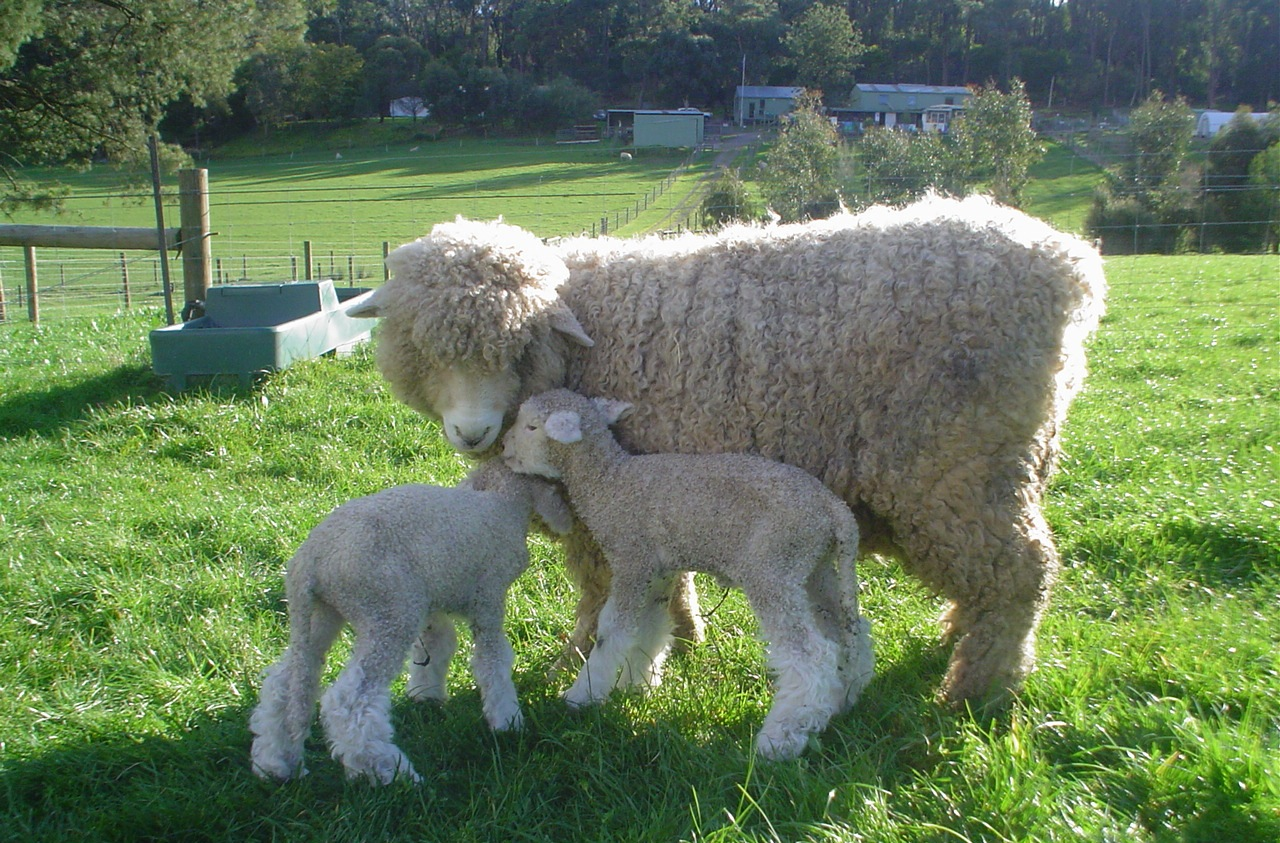
Romney Ewe and Lamb

Meats such as Romney salt marsh lamb are produced from grazing grass and samphire in salt marshes; the meat is notable for a distinctively sweet and rich flavour. The meat is either sold in local farm shops and restaurants or exported to France.

The wool is long and has a coarse texture to it that remains heavy during harsh weather. It is used in tweed, hand knitting and upholstery. The Romney breed is typically sheared during summer months. Flocks in New Zealand achieve more than 1.7 lambs per ewe, which is more than observed in England.

Adapted to wetlands, the Romney is believed to be less susceptible to foot rot and liver flukes compared to other breeds. This trait was observed as early as 1918, when it was noted as follows: "It is said that foot rot and liver fluke seldom affect Romney Marsh sheep." In 2001, a book links this as an adaption to the harsh marshy landscape: "Romneys are said to be somewhat resistant to foot rot, liver flukes and other problems that often plague sheep in damp pastures."

== See also ==
- New Zealand Romney
- Romney Marsh
- Hickman v Kent or Romney Marsh Sheep-Breeders' Association
