= New Zealand Romney =

New Zealand breed of sheep

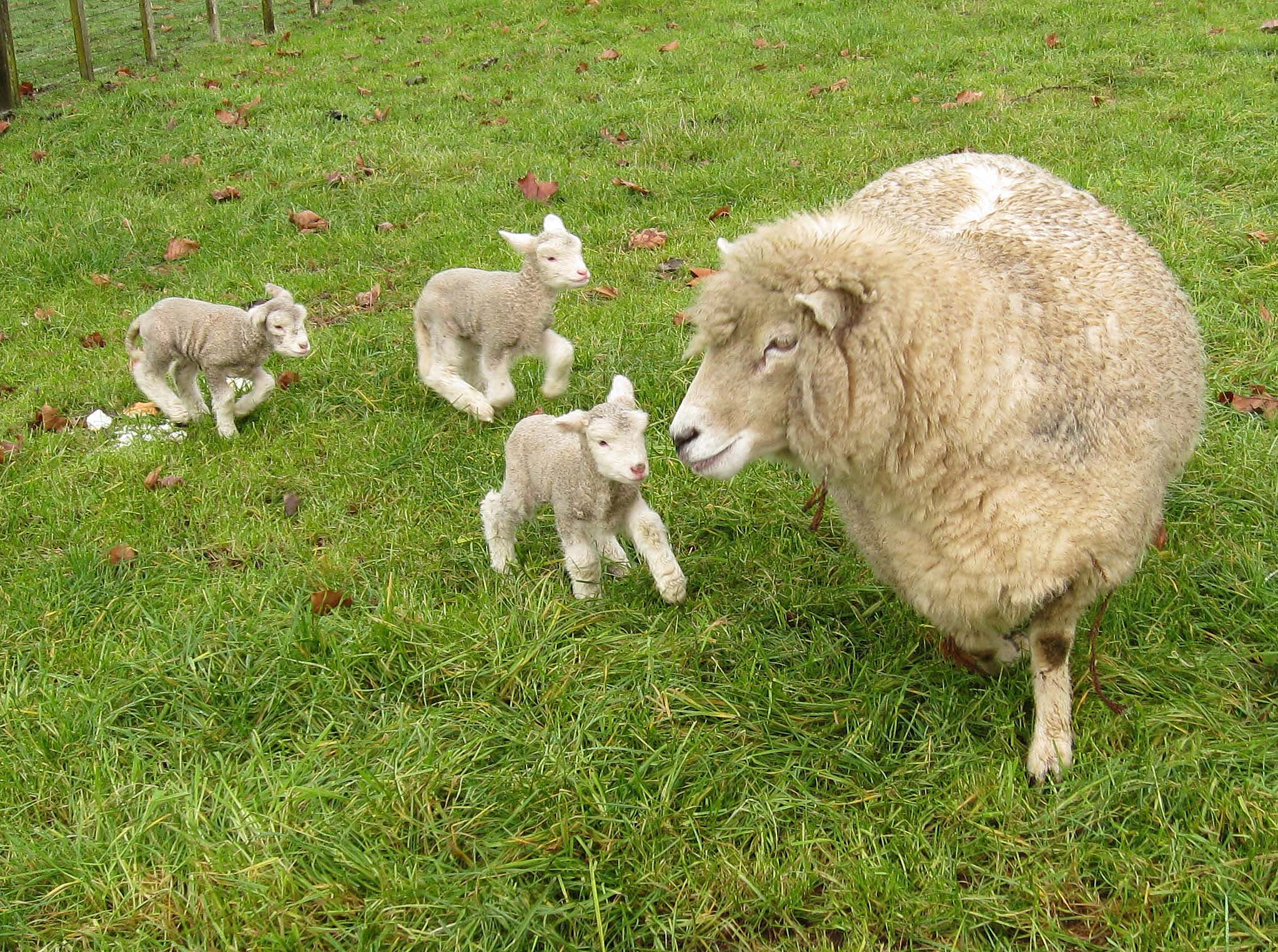
- Ewe with triplet lambs
- Conservation status: FAO (2007): no data; DAD-IS (2026): unknown
- Other names: New Zealand Romney Marsh; Romney; Modern Romney
- Country of origin: New Zealand
- Use: meat; wool

Traits
- Weight: Male: 90–110 kg; Female: 55–70 kg
- Wool colour: white
- Face colour: white
- Horn status: polled

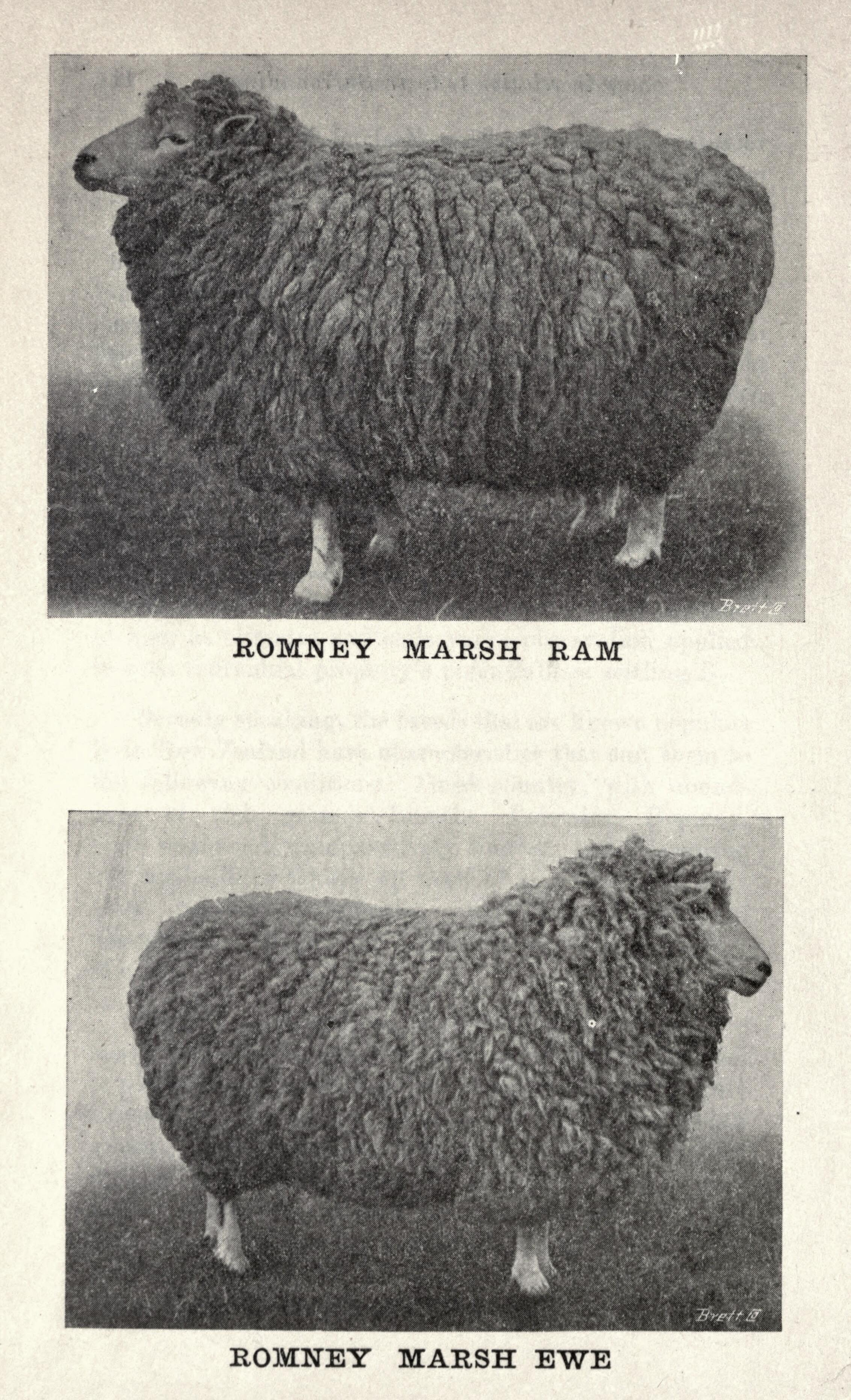
Ram and ewe, illustration from 1915

The New Zealand Romney is a New Zealand breed of sheep. It derives from British Romney Marsh stock imported to New Zealand in the nineteenth century, and was established as a separate breed in 1904. It is the most numerous sheep breed in New Zealand.

== History ==
The New Zealand Romney derives from British Romney Marsh stock imported to New Zealand in the nineteenth century. It was established as a separate breed in 1904 with the formation of the New Zealand Romney Marsh Sheep Breeders' Association, and the first flock-book was published in the following year.

By 1915 it was the most numerous sheep breed in the country. In 2000 the Romney constituted almost 60% of the national herd, with some 26.3 million head.

It has contributed to the development of a number of modern breeds, among them the Coopworth, the Drysdale, the Elliotdale, the Perendale and the Tukidale in New Zealand, and the Romeldale in the United States.

== Characteristics ==
The New Zealand Romney is a thick-set white-woolled sheep of medium size; ewes weigh some 55 to 70 kg and rams between 90 and 110 kg. It is a polled breed. The hooves are black. The face is white with a pronounced topknot; there is some kemp on the face and legs. Ewes have good maternal qualities, but low prolificacy compared to some other breeds.

== Use ==
The New Zealand Romney is reared for both meat and wool. Fleeces weigh about 6 kg; staple length is in the range 180–230 mm, with a fibre diameter of some 32–36 μm (Bradford count 48/46s). The wool is used for clothing, for blankets, for hosiery, and for carpets.
