= Henry Edward Field =

New Zealand educational psychologist (1903–1991)

Henry Edward Field OBE (11 July 1903 – 28 March 1991) was a New Zealand educational psychologist, educationalist and university professor. He was born in Christchurch, New Zealand, on 11 July 1903.

In the 1973 New Year Honours, Field was appointed an Officer of the Order of the British Empire, for services to education.
