= Francis Dry =

New Zealand geneticist, wool researcher (1891–1979)

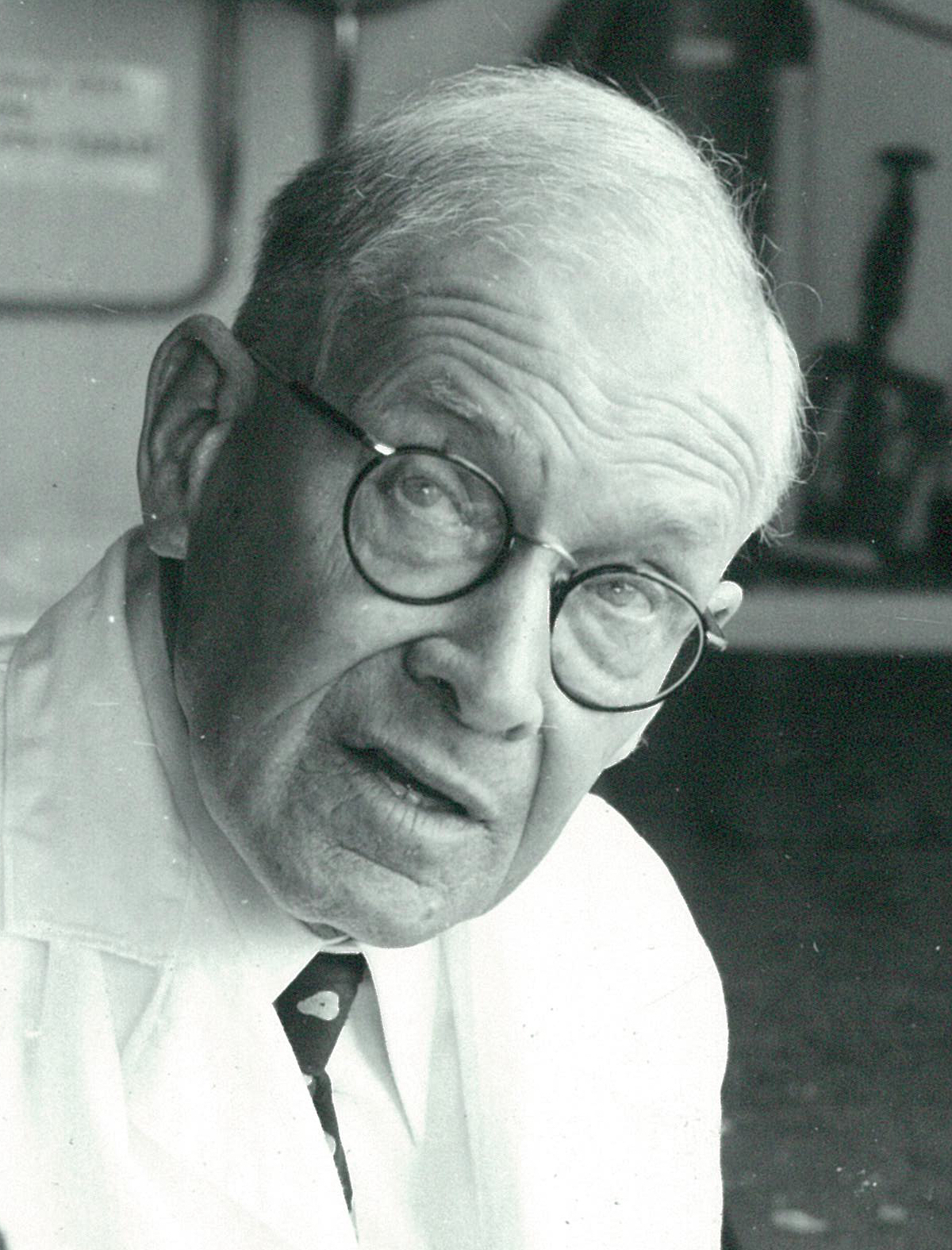
Dry in 1974

Francis William Dry OBE (23 October 1891 – 14 July 1979) was a New Zealand geneticist, biologist, university lecturer and wool researcher. He was born in Driffield, Yorkshire, England, on 23 October 1891.

In the 1973 New Year Honours, Dry was appointed an Officer of the Order of the British Empire, for services to the wool industry.

== Biography ==
Francis William Dry was born in Driffield, Yorkshire, in 1891 to Frank Dry and Mary Avis Corke. He received his schooling at Driffield Board School and Bridlington Grammar School before graduating BSc (1913) and MSc (1914) from the University of Leeds.

After a stint in Kenya and the United States, where he got married, Dry returned to Leeds in 1921 and was awarded an Ackroyd Memorial Research Fellowship. This was a watershed moment in his career and laid the basis for his future research. For his PhD that followed, he made a study of the coat of the mouse. This research was published in 1926 and for many decades remained the definitive study of hair growth in mice.

At this time Dry also became involved in research on the coats of sheep, a subject in which he would specialize for the rest of his career. In 1928 he was appointed as senior lecturer in agricultural zoology at the newly established Massey Agricultural College in Palmerston North, New Zealand. Here Dry focused his research on the problem wool producers were experiencing of having an excessive amount of hairy fibres (halo-hairs) in crossbred wool clip.

By careful selective breeding of his control Romney flock of very hairy sheep at the college, Dry and his students proved that the prevalence of hairy fibres were determined genetically - specifically by the presence of a dominant N-gene. Following World War II, there was increased interest in Dry's sheep flock as it was discovered that hairy fibres were ideally suited for carpet production.

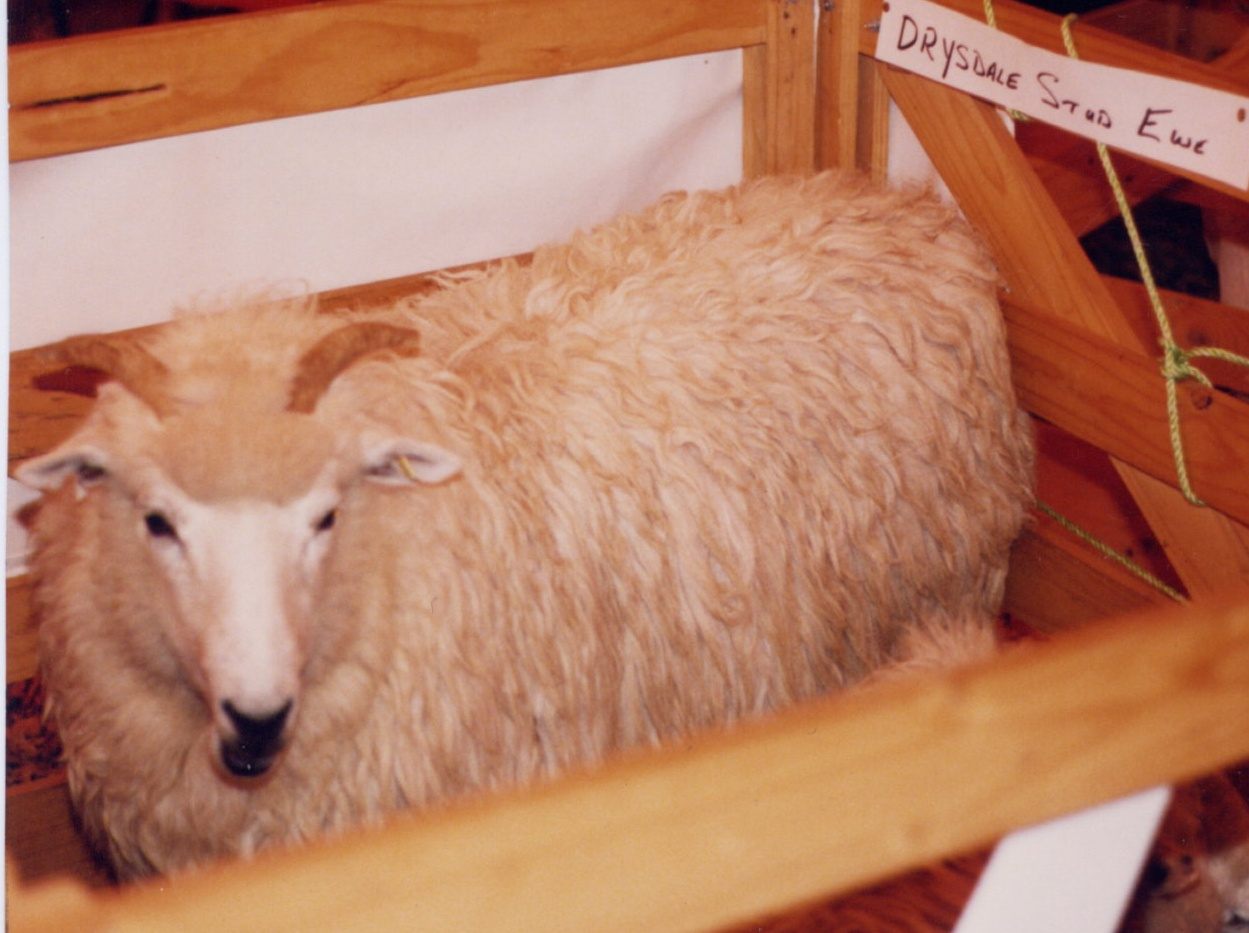
A Drysdale ewe

Dry, by now an associate-professor, retired from Massey Agricultural College in 1956 and returned to the University of Leeds to occupy an honorary fellowship in the Department of Textile Industries. Here he proved the suitability of the wool of his sheep flock for carpet manufacturing. From 1961 to 1962 specialty carpet-wool production was set up at Massey Agricultural College to further investigate coarse wool fibres for carpet production. Dry's original sheep flock was further developed and the resulting new breed of sheep was named the Drysdale breed in his honor.

Dry and his wife, Florence, returned to Palmerston North in 1963 and he continued his research on wool fibre. This led to the publication of The architecture of lambs' coats: a speculative study in 1975. For his considerable contribution to academia and research, Dry was given an honorary doctorate by Massey University in 1966 - the first time the university awarded this to a university lecturer. In 1973 he received an OBE.

He died in Palmerston North on 14 July 1979.
