= Henry Charles McQueen =

Teacher, university lecturer, vocational research officer, commissioner of apprenticeship

Henry Charles McQueen OBE (6 July 1898 – 30 March 1976) was a New Zealand teacher, university lecturer, vocational research officer and commissioner of apprenticeship. He was born in Beaconsfield, Tasmania, Australia, on 6 July 1898. In 1927 he completed a thesis in on the effects of movie-watching on children.

In the 1973 New Year Honours, McQueen was appointed an Officer of the Order of the British Empire, for services to the community.
