= 1973 New Year Honours (New Zealand) =

Annual awards for New Zealanders

The 1973 New Year Honours in New Zealand were appointments by Elizabeth II on the advice of the New Zealand government to various orders and honours to reward and highlight good works by New Zealanders. The awards celebrated the passing of 1972 and the beginning of 1973, and were announced on 1 January 1973.

The recipients of honours are displayed here as they were styled before their new honour.

== Order of the Companions of Honour (CH) ==
- The Right Honourable John Ross Marshall MP – lately Prime Minister of New Zealand.
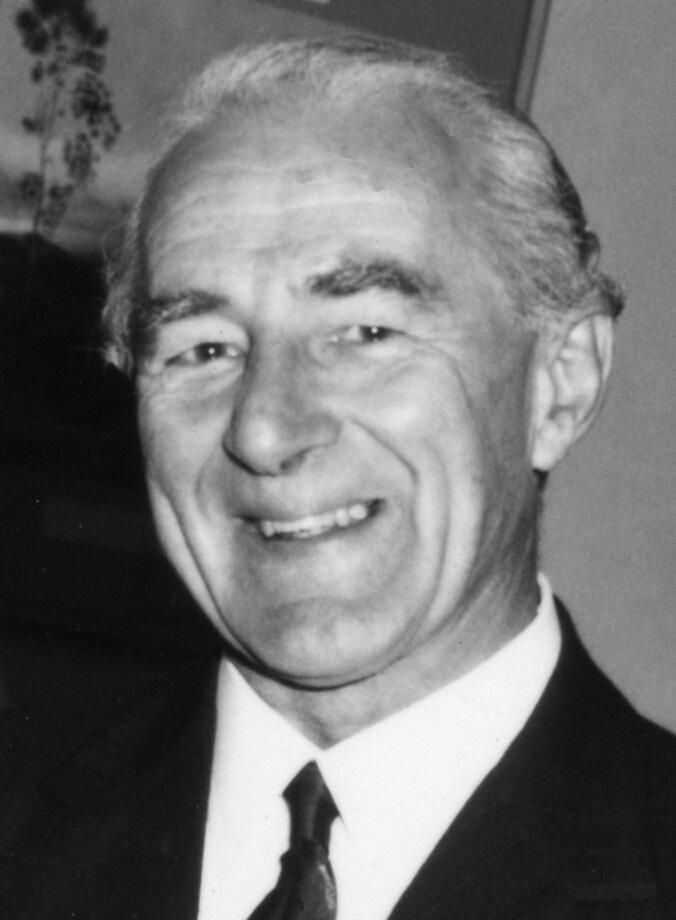
Jack Marshall

== Knight Bachelor ==
- Geoffrey Newland Roberts CBE AFC – of Wellsford. For outstanding services to aviation.
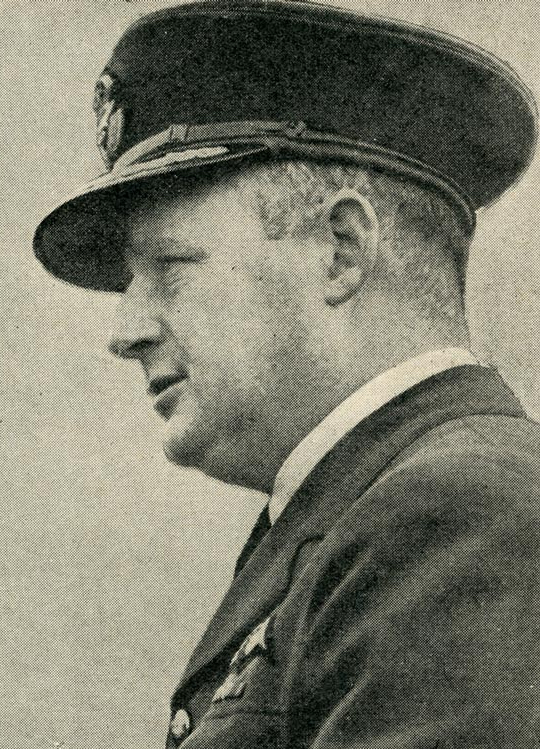
Geoffrey Roberts

== Order of Saint Michael and Saint George ==
=== Companion (CMG) ===
- Alfred Ernest Allen – lately Speaker, House of Representatives.
- Leonard Poulter Leary MC QC – of Auckland. For valuable services to law.
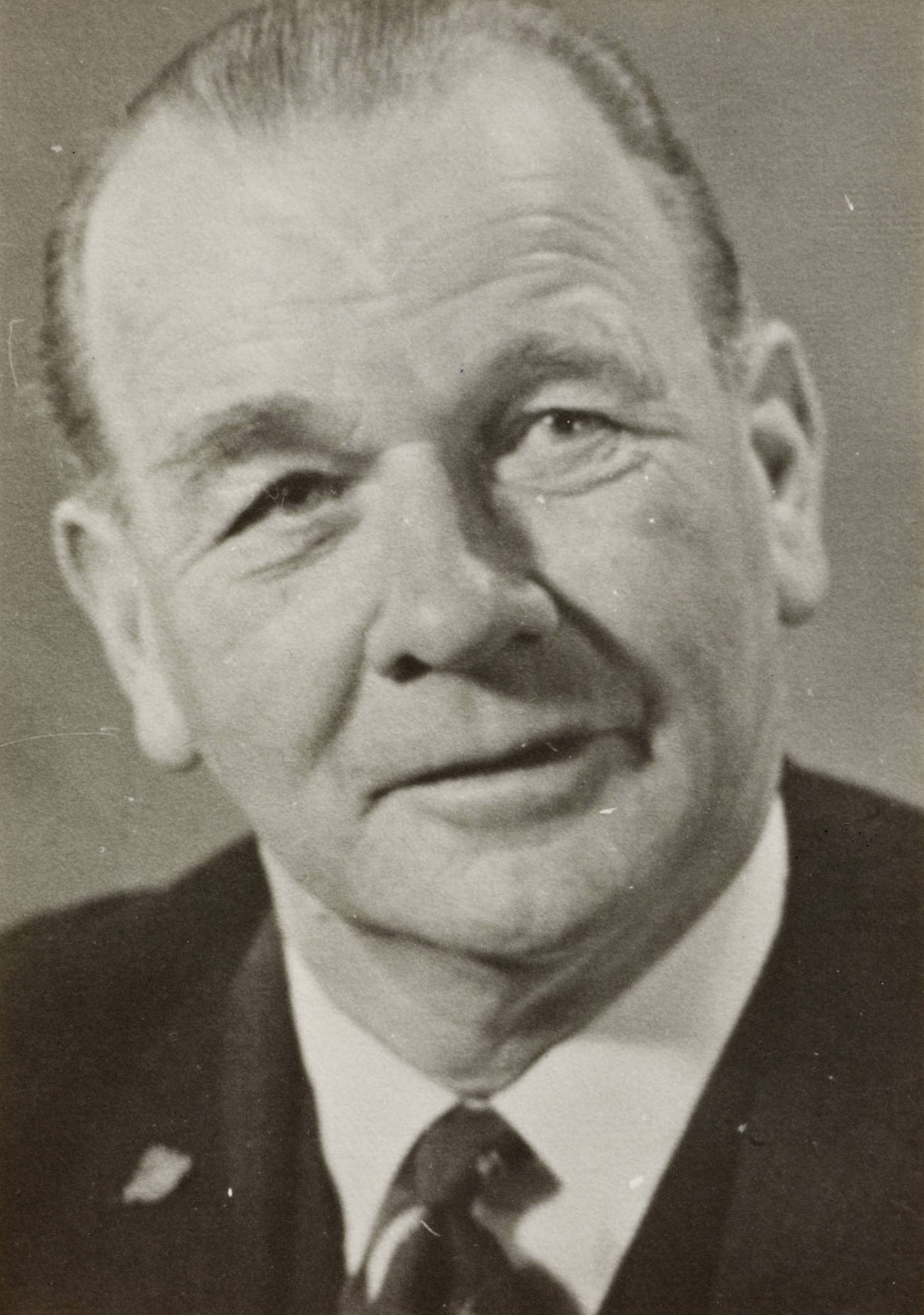
Alf Allen

== Order of the British Empire ==
=== Knight Commander (KBE) ===
Civil division

- Robert Alexander Falla CMG – of Wellington. For outstanding services to conservation.
- The Right Honourable Sir Alexander Kingcome Turner QC – of Wellington. For outstanding services as president of the Court of Appeal.
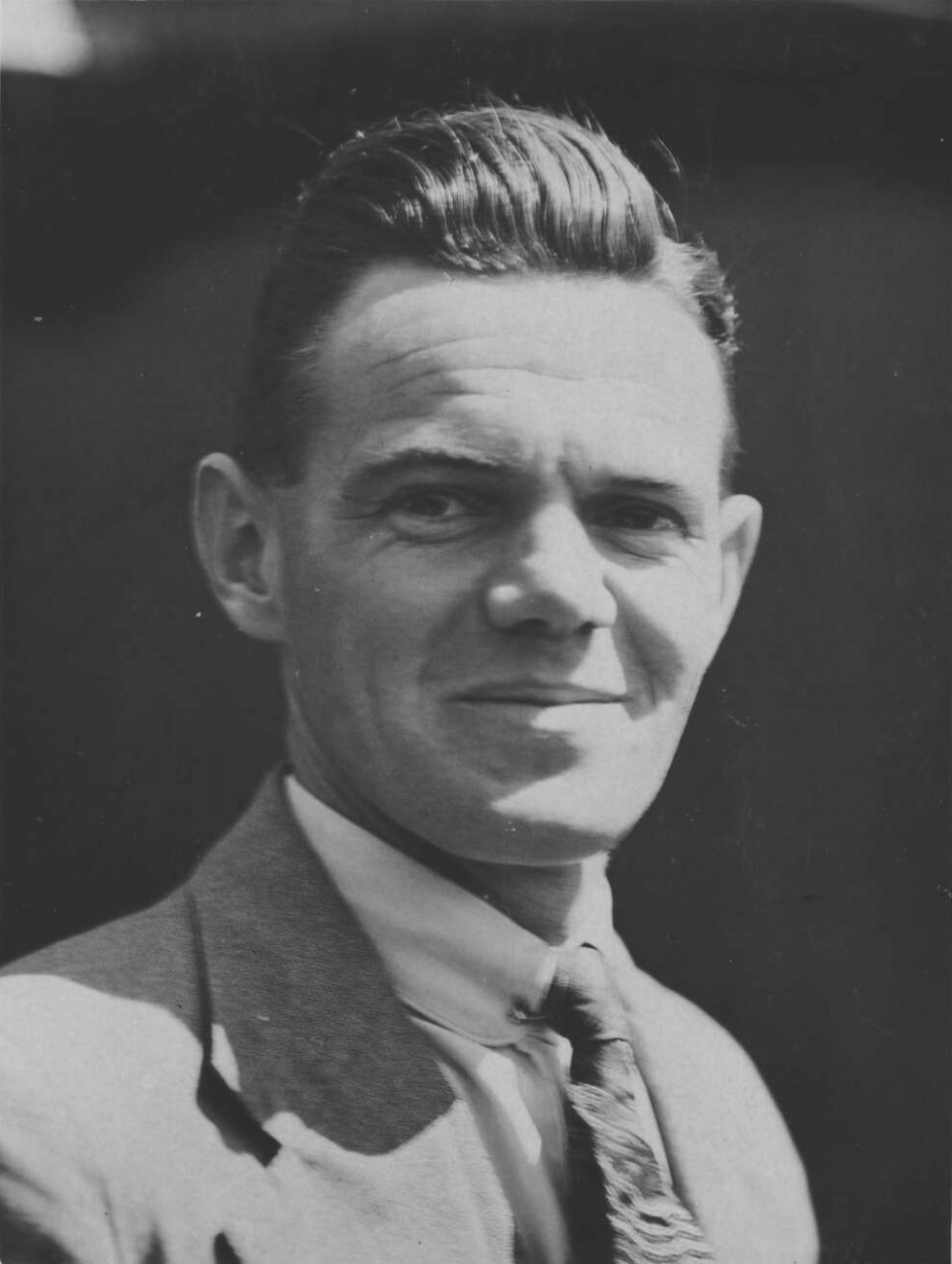
Sir Robert Falla

=== Commander (CBE) ===
Civil division

- Graham Francis Hall – of Wellington. For very valuable services to medicine.
- William Maxwell Manchester – of Papatoetoe. For very valuable services as head of the Middlemore plastic surgical unit.
- The Honourable William Blair Tennent – of Palmerston North. For very valuable services in politics and education.
- Robert Martin Williams – of Dunedin. For very valuable services to science, administration and education.

Military division

- Air Commodore Ernest Charles Gartrell OBE DFC – Deputy Chief of Air Staff.
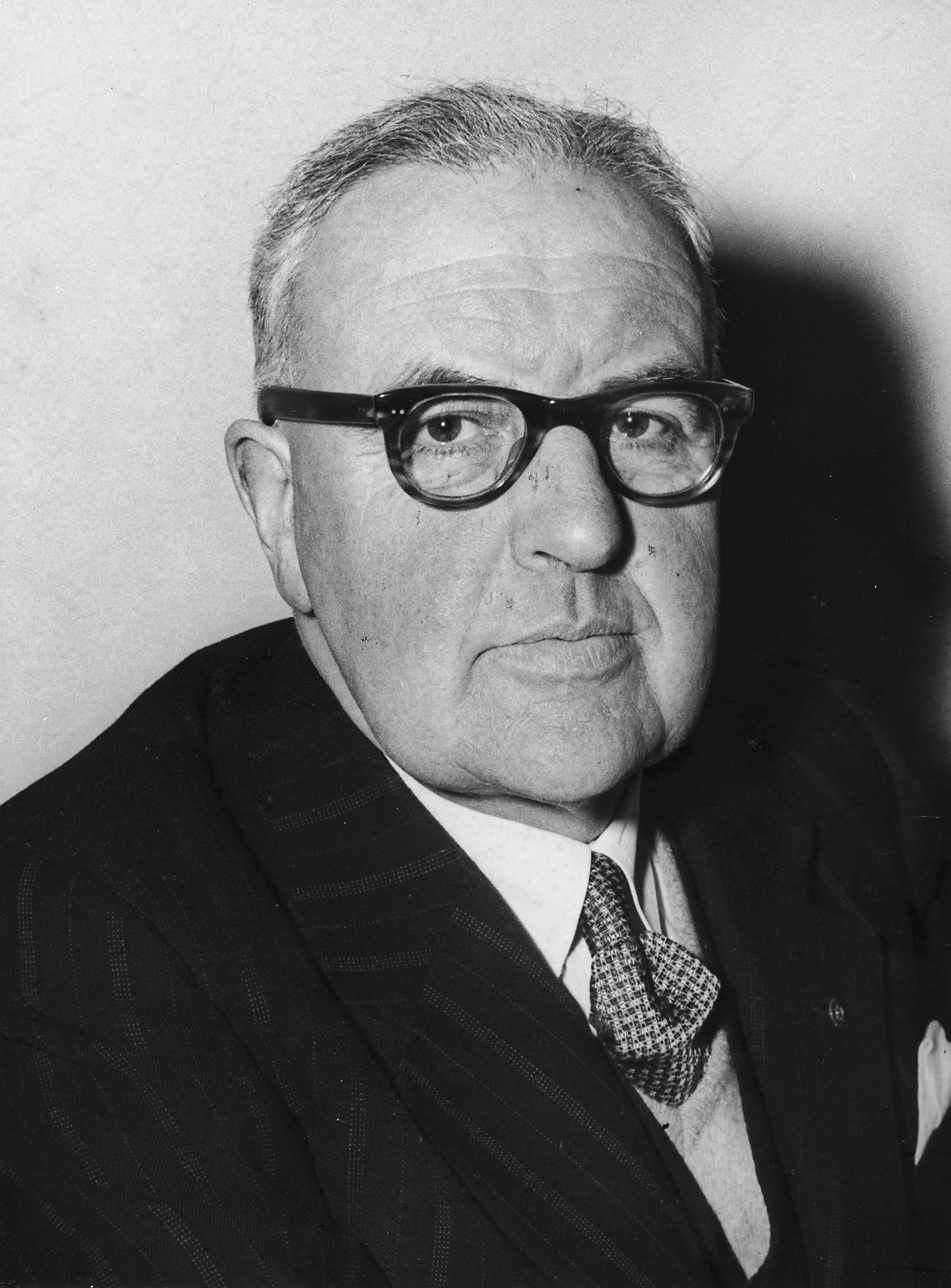
Blair Tennent

=== Officer (OBE) ===
Civil division

- Professor Dennis Geoffrey Bonham – of Auckland. For valuable services to medicine.
- George Cyril Burton – of Wellington. For valuable services to the community.
- Robert Donald Cox – of Auckland. For valuable services to commerce.
- Cecil Lancelot Stewart Cross – of Wellington. For valuable services to sports administration.
- Francis William Dry – of Palmerston North. For valuable services to the wool industry.
- Henry Edward Field – of Christchurch. For valuable services to education.
- Leonard Charles Harrison – of Stratford. For valuable services to the community.
- Henry Charles McQueen – of Wellington. For valuable services to the community.
- The Honourable John Mathison – of Christchurch. For valuable services to politics.
- Robert Richmond Rex. For valuable services to the people of Niue.
- William Newton Sheat – of Lower Hutt. For valuable services to the arts.
- Matiu Te Hau – of Auckland. For valuable services to Māori education.
- Charles Stewart Thomas – of Christchurch. For valuable services to the community.
- George Augustus Walsh – of Tauranga. For valuable services to politics.

Military division

- Commander John Wilfred Harper Fullerton Dickie – Royal New Zealand Navy.
- Colonel Maurice Craig Churton ED – Royal New Zealand Infantry Regiment (Territorial Force).
- Group Captain Walter Graham Hughes – Royal New Zealand Air Force.
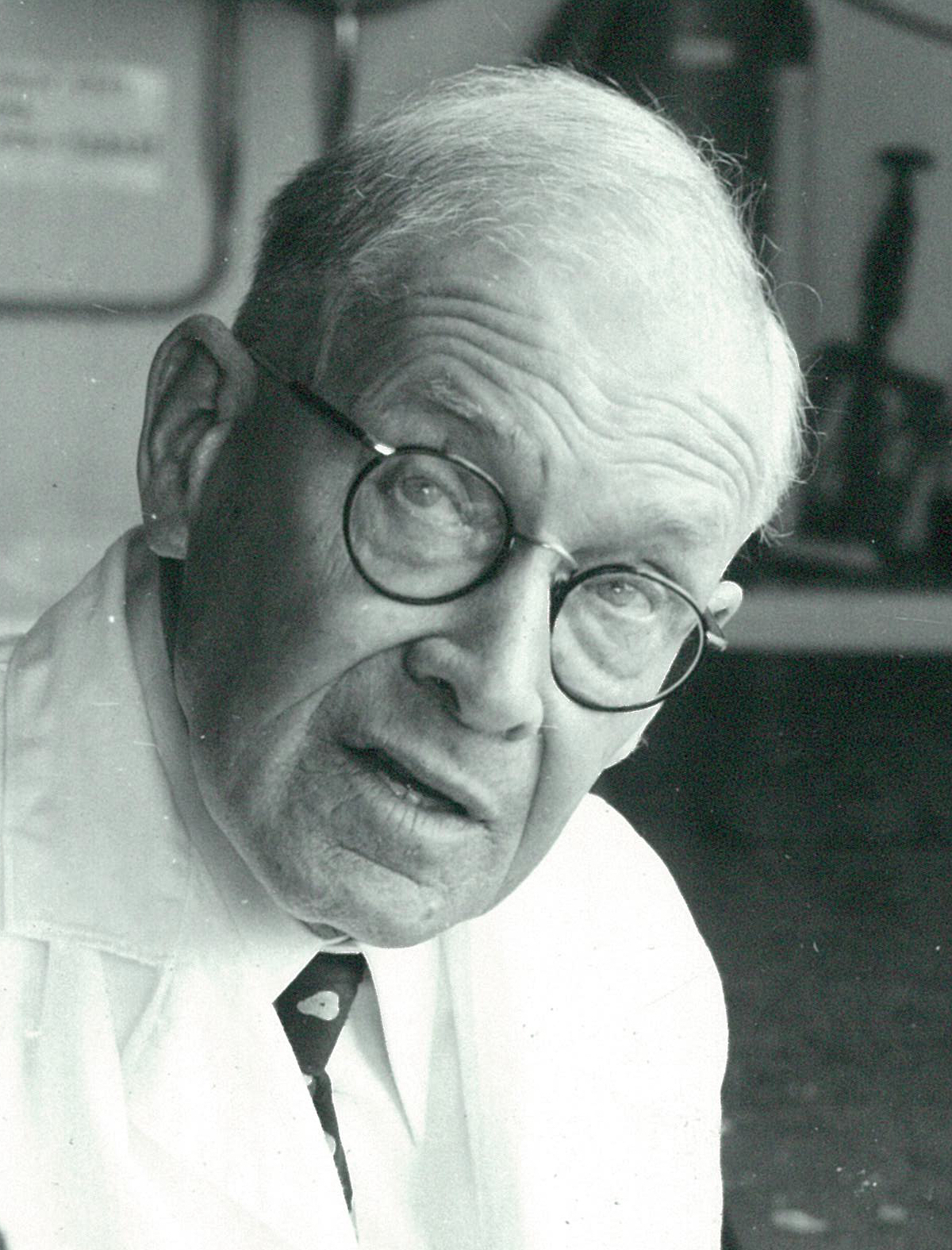
Francis Dry

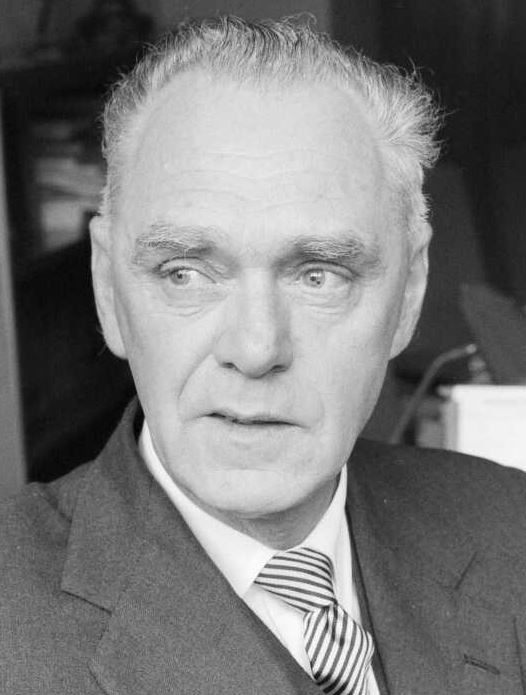
John Mathison

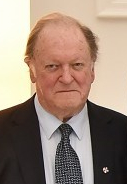
Bill Sheat

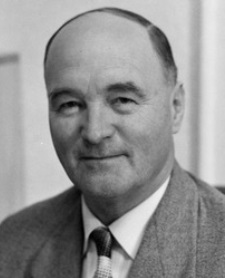
George Walsh

=== Member (MBE) ===
Civil division

- Ronald Gilmour Anderson – of Cheviot. For services to local government.
- John McKay Archibald – of Southland. For services to the community.
- William James Cronshaw Ashcroft – of Havelock North. For services to local government.
- John Harband Brunt – of Nelson. For services to the community, especially the Nelson Harbour Board.
- Stanley Norman Chatfield – of Ōpōtiki. For services to local government.
- David Bartholomew Curry – of Masterton. For services to the community.
- James Riddle Earwaker – of Alexandra. For services to the community.
- Robert Stephenson Jordan Fitzgerald – of Oamaru. For services to medicine and the community.
- James Guy – of Te Kōpuru. For services to the community.
- Enyth Muriel Holdgate – of Auckland. For services to nursing.
- Anirau Miria Karauria – of Mount Maunganui. For services to the Māori community
- Winifred Frances Lysnar – of Gisborne. For services to the community.
- Ivall Moira Macdonald – of Invercargill. For services to the community and especially the Girl Guides Association.
- Shona Graham McFarlane – of Dunedin. For services to the arts.
- Beatrice Annie Matheson – of Raglan. For services to the community.
- Alexander Prentice – of Christchurch. For services to the community.
- Donald David Rowlands – of Auckland. For services to rowing.
- Ronald Henshall Simmons – of Auckland. For services to the community,
- Ernest William Taylor – of Hamilton. For services to the community.
- Waiharakeke Waitere – of Putiki. For services to the Māori community.
- John Anthony Roy Walker – of Otautau. For services to the community.

Military division

- Lieutenant Commander Joseph Grant – Royal New Zealand Navy (Retired).
- Lieutenant Commander William Murton Wheeler – Royal New Zealand Naval Volunteer Reserve (Retired); Sea Cadet Corps, New Zealand Cadet Forces.
- Warrant Officer First Class Jack Colin Cocker – Royal New Zealand Infantry Regiment (Regular Force).
- Major John Lawrence Manning ED – Royal New Zealand Infantry Regiment (Territorial Force).
- Captain Philip Richard Robert Rutherford – Royal New Zealand Artillery (Regular Force).
- Warrant Officer Second Class Robert John Whitefield – Royal New Zealand Electrical and Mechanical Engineers (Territorial Force).
- Squadron Leader Roger Musson Cattermole – Royal New Zealand Air Force.
- Warrant Officer Patrick Christopher Rice – Royal New Zealand Air Force.
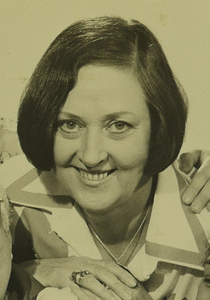
Shona McFarlane

== Companion of the Imperial Service Order (ISO) ==
- Leslie James Davis – of Auckland, lately High Commissioner of the Cook Islands.

== British Empire Medal (BEM) ==
=== For gallantry ===
Civil division

- Geoffrey Stewart Barrett – of Wainuiomata. For gallantry shown in seizing an armed murderer in Wellington.

Military division

- Petty Officer Walter Steel Inglis – Royal New Zealand Navy. For gallantry shown in seizing an armed murderer in Wellington.

=== For meritorious service ===
Civil division

- Christabel Lenore Bending – of Marton. For services to the community.
- Alice Bent – of New Plymouth. For services to the community.
- Peter Vincent Keown – constable, New Zealand Police Force. For services to the community, particularly search and rescue in the Wānaka area.
- Walter McDougall – of Lower Hutt. For services to the community.
- Eva Marion Rimmer – of Edgecumbe. For services to paraplegics.
- Norman William Rossiter – of Westport. For services to the community.
- John William Roughan – Director of Public Works, Niue.
- Wesley Newsome Stanley – of Hastings. For services to the community.

Military division

- Acting Warrant Radioman Allan Parker – Royal New Zealand Navy.
- Chief Petty Officer Writer David Alexander Seaton – Royal New Zealand Navy.
- Petty Officer Engineering Mechanic Dennis John Stapleton – Royal New Zealand Navy.
- Corporal David Ian Bird – Royal New Zealand Army Service Corps (Regular Force).
- Sergeant Hori Heteri Hokianga – Royal New Zealand Infantry Regiment (Territorial Force).
- Sergeant (Temporary Staff Sergeant) Gilbert Alan Mains – Royal New Zealand Infantry Regiment (Territorial Force).
- Flight Sergeant Eric Stanley Dark – Royal New Zealand Air Force.
- Corporal James Burns Duncan – Royal New Zealand Air Force.
- Flight Sergeant Desmond Bruce Harlick – Royal New Zealand Air Force.
Eve Rimmer

== Air Force Cross (AFC) ==
- Wing Commander Ivor Veitch Mackay – Royal New Zealand Air Force.

== Queen's Fire Service Medal (QFSM) ==
- Gordon Drummond – chief fire service officer, New Zealand Fire Service Council.
- Randolph William McMillan – chief fire officer, Temuka Volunteer Fire Brigade.
- Elvyn Francis Quinlan – secretary, United Fire Brigades Association of New Zealand.

== Queen's Commendation for Valuable Service in the Air ==
- Master Signaller Noel Joseph Crump – Royal New Zealand Air Force.
