= Geoffrey Roberts (airline manager) =

New Zealand aviator (1906–1995)

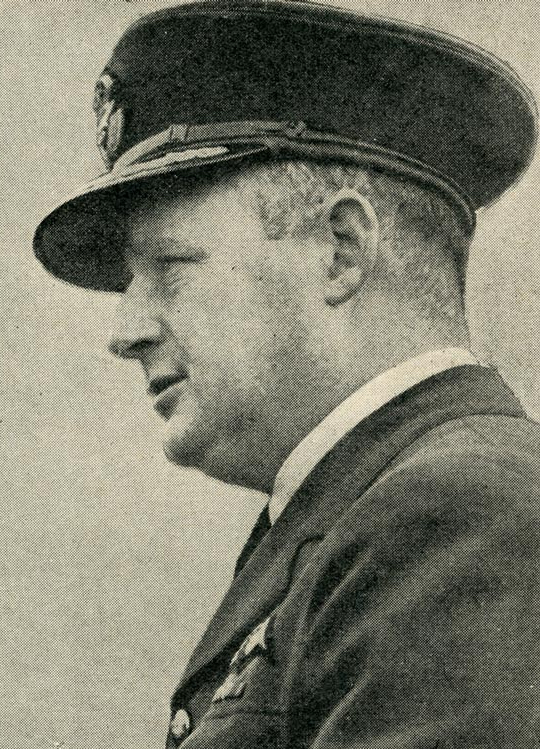
Roberts in 1943

Sir Geoffrey Newland Roberts CBE AFC (8 December 1906 – 27 August 1995) was a New Zealand military aviator and leader, and airline manager. He was born in Inglewood, Taranaki, New Zealand in 1906.

Roberts was the first commander of No. 1 Squadron, being appointed to the role in May 1940. He was awarded the Air Force Cross in the 1941 King's Birthday Honours. He commanded the New Zealand Air Task Force, which was headquartered at Bougainville. In 1946 he was appointed a Commander of the Order of the British Empire in recognition of his service in operations against the Japanese. He was appointed a Knight Bachelor, for services to aviation, in the 1973 New Year Honours.

In 2001, Roberts was posthumously inducted into the New Zealand Business Hall of Fame.
