= Leonard Leary =

New Zealand lawyer and writer

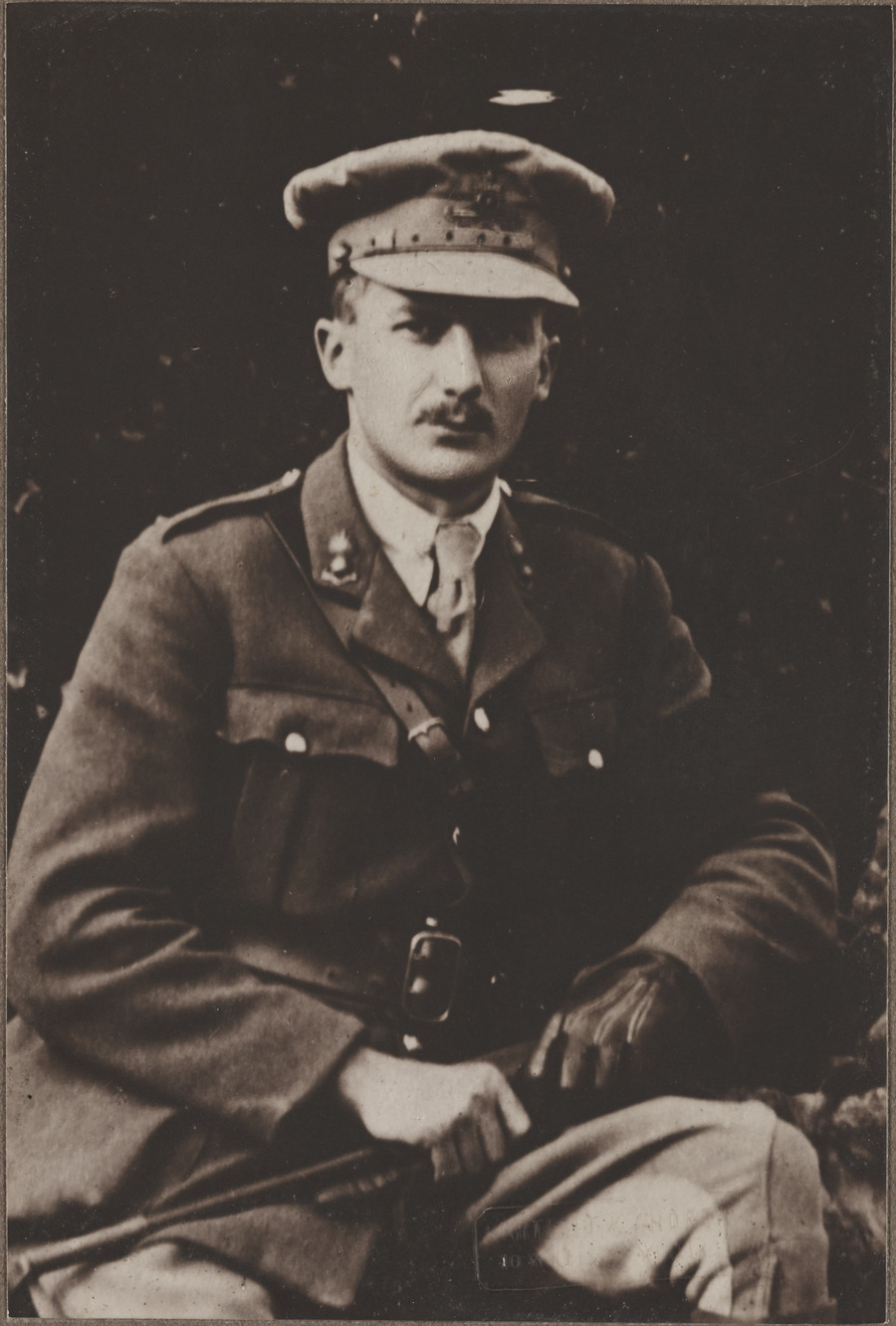
Captain L. P. Leary photograph (1920)

Leonard Poulter Leary CMG MC QC (24 March 1891 – 11 April 1990) was a New Zealand lawyer and writer. He was born in Palmerston North, New Zealand, on 24 March 1891.

Leary was appointed Queen's Counsel on 7 February 1952. In the 1973 New Year Honours, he was appointed a Companion of the Order of St Michael and St George, for services to the law. In 1977, he was awarded the Queen Elizabeth II Silver Jubilee Medal.
