= 1941 Birthday Honours (New Zealand) =

Awards list for New Zealand

The 1941 King's Birthday Honours in New Zealand, celebrating the official birthday of King George VI, were appointments made by the King to various orders and honours. All but one of the awards were made in recognition of war service by New Zealanders and were announced on 1 July 1941. Only one civilian award was made, announced 12 June, on to a police officer who rescued a woman from drowning in the Waikato River.

The recipients of honours are displayed here as they were styled before their new honour.

== Order of the British Empire ==
=== Commander (CBE) ===
Military division, additional

- Air Commodore Hugh William Lumsden Saunders MC DFC MM – of Wellington; attached Royal New Zealand Air Force.
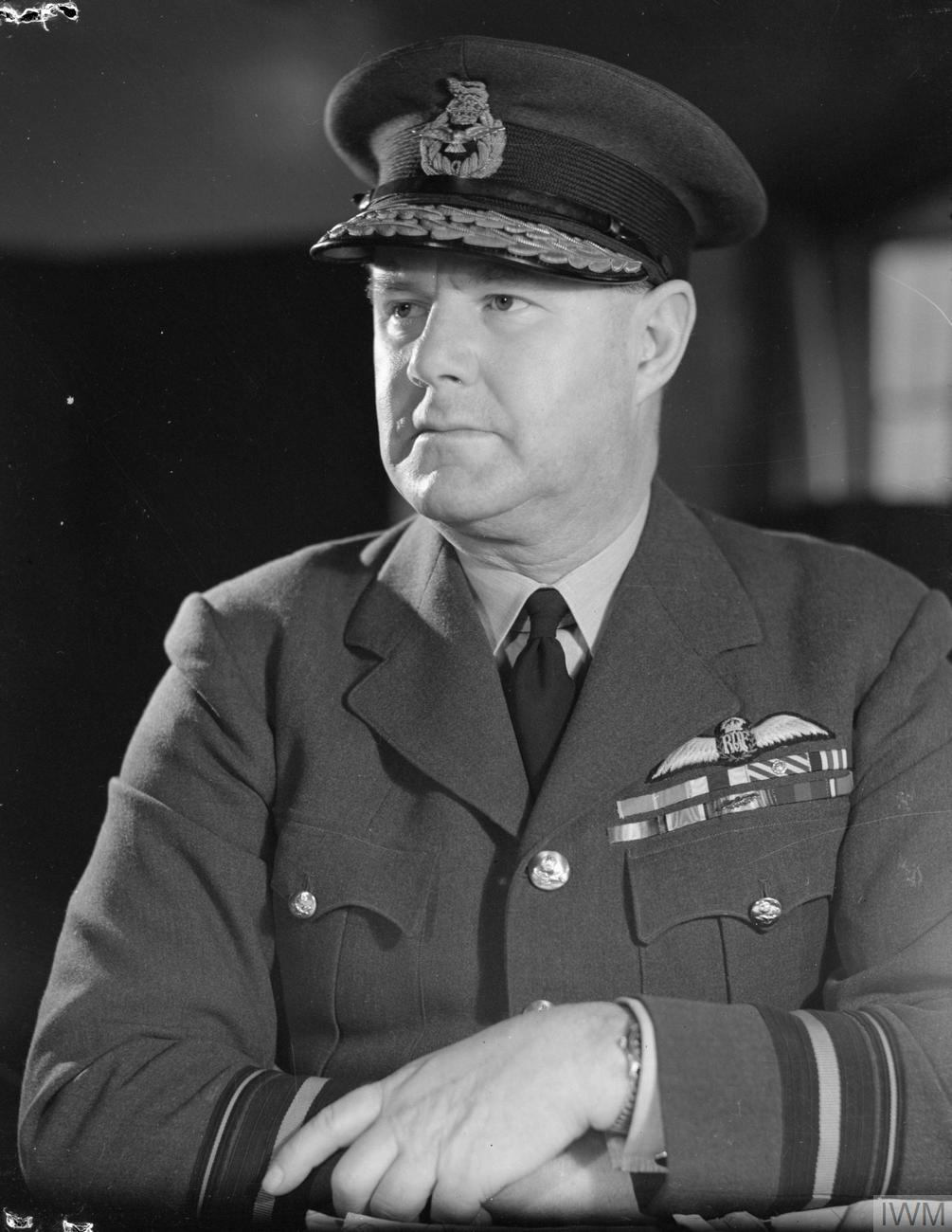
Hugh Saunders

=== Officer (OBE) ===
Military division, additional

- Lieutenant-Colonel Derisley Thayer Wood – of Whangārei; New Zealand Mounted Brigade, New Zealand Military Forces.

=== Member (MBE) ===
Military division, additional

- Warrant Officer Class I (Staff Sergeant-Major) Harry Lewis Stovell Frank – of Nelson; Permanent Staff, New Zealand Military Forces.
- Frederick Walter Jelliff – commissioned gunner, Royal Navy.

== Air Force Cross (AFC) ==
- Squadron Leader Geoffrey Newland Roberts – of Auckland; Royal New Zealand Air Force.
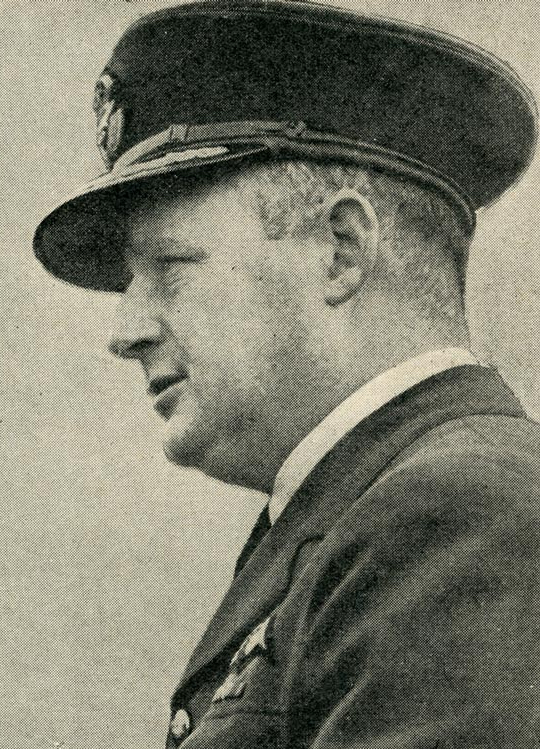
Geoffrey Roberts

== King's Police and Fire Services Medal (KPFSM) ==
For gallantry

- Donald Austin – of Hamilton; sergeant, New Zealand Police Force. For praiseworthy conduct in rescuing a woman from drowning in the Waikato River on 15 November.
  Sergeant Austin, who was attached to the Hamilton Police Station at the time and who is now stationed at Tauranga, jumped into the Waikato River to rescue an elderly woman. The woman, who apparently fell from the railway bridge, was seen to be floating downstream. When the alarm was given Sergeant Austin ran from Victoria Street across the bridge, scrambled down the bank, and despite the fact that he was out of breath after his 300 yards dash, he* threw off his jacket and boots and dived in. He had to swim some distance before he caught the woman, who was almost unconscious, and then had a strong pull into the bank. Other helpers had rushed to the spot and assisted him up the bank.
