= Hickman v Kent or Romney Marsh Sheep-Breeders' Association =

British company law case

Hickman v Kent or Romney Marsh Sheep-Breeders’ Association
- Court: High Court
- Citation: [1915] 1 Ch 881

Keywords
- Company constitution, arbitration

Hickman v Kent or Romney Marsh Sheep-Breeders’ Association [1915] 1 Ch 881 is a UK company law case, concerning the proper interpretation of a company's articles, and whether a company member could be bound by its terms.

== Facts ==
The conflict arose when Hickman complained about the association's refusal to register his sheep in its official flock book, after which he was threatened with expulsion. Article 49 of the association's articles of incorporation stipulated that any disputes between the association and its members must be referred to arbitration. Hickman chose to bypass arbitration and initiated a legal action against the association in the High Court claiming multiple irregularities, including the refusal to register his sheep and the threat of expulsion. In response, the association sought an injunction, insisting that the matter be handled according to the arbitration clause.

== Judgment ==
Astbury J held that the articles prevented Mr Hickman: there was a contract. He was bound. The predecessor to the Companies Act 2006 section 33 creates a contract, which affects members in their capacity as members, though not in a special or personal capacity (e.g. as director). As a member, Mr Hickman was bound to comply with the company procedure for arbitrating disputes and could not resort to court.

== See also ==
- UK company law
