= Coopworth =

New Zealand breed of sheep

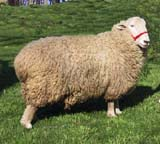
- A ram in the United States
- Conservation status: FAO (2007): not at risk; DAD-IS (2021): unknown
- Country of origin: New Zealand
- Distribution: Australia; Europe; United States
- Use: meat

Traits
- Weight: Male: 50–70 kg; Female: average 55 kg
- Skin colour: white
- Wool colour: white
- Face colour: white
- Horn status: polled

The Coopworth is a modern New Zealand breed of sheep. It was developed by researchers at Lincoln College in the Canterbury region of the South Island between about 1956 and 1968, the result of cross-breeding of New Zealand Romney ewes and Border Leicester rams. It has become the second-most numerous sheep breed in New Zealand, and has been exported to Australia, some European countries, and the United States.

== History ==
The Coopworth was developed between about 1956 and 1968 at Lincoln College (now Lincoln University), near Christchurch in the Canterbury region of the South Island by researchers under Ian Coop. The aim of the project was to increase the prolificacy or lambing percentage of ewes. To this end, New Zealand Romney ewes were put to Border Leicester rams; the Border Leicester was at that time the most prolific breed in New Zealand. Successive generations were then selectively bred based on strict performance recording for factors including fertility, maternal qualities, rate of growth and fleece weight. Results came fast – by about the fourth generation the cross-bred line was thought better than a direct Romney–Border Leicester cross, despite the benefit of heterosis in the latter. A breed association, the Coopworth Sheep Society of New Zealand, was formed in 1968 after a meeting of breeders.

The Coopworth soon became widespread. By 1984 it was the second-most numerous breed in New Zealand after the Romney, constituting almost 20% of the national flock and almost half the number of Romneys; in 2000 it represented about 10% of the whole population, while the Romney made up almost 60%.

It was soon exported to Australia (from 1975), to the United States (from 1970) and to some European countries.

== Characteristics ==
The Coopworth looks much like the Romney, but is rather larger. It is of medium size: mature ewes weigh about 55 kg, rams some 50–70 kg. It is polled, white-faced and white-woolled; the face and legs are free of wool. It is a lowland sheep, more suited to improved lowland pasture than to hill country.

The Woodlands Coopworth is a strain within the Coopworth breed, characterised by an X-linked gene which increases ovulation by about 40%, and so contributes to greater fecundity.

== Use ==
The Coopworth is reared for both meat and wool. Fleeces weigh about 5 kg; staple length is in the range 200–230 mm, with a fibre diameter of about 35 μm (Bradford count 48/46s). The wool is used for clothing, for hand-spinning, and in carpet blends.
