= Integrated sheep-vineyard system =

Agricultural practice

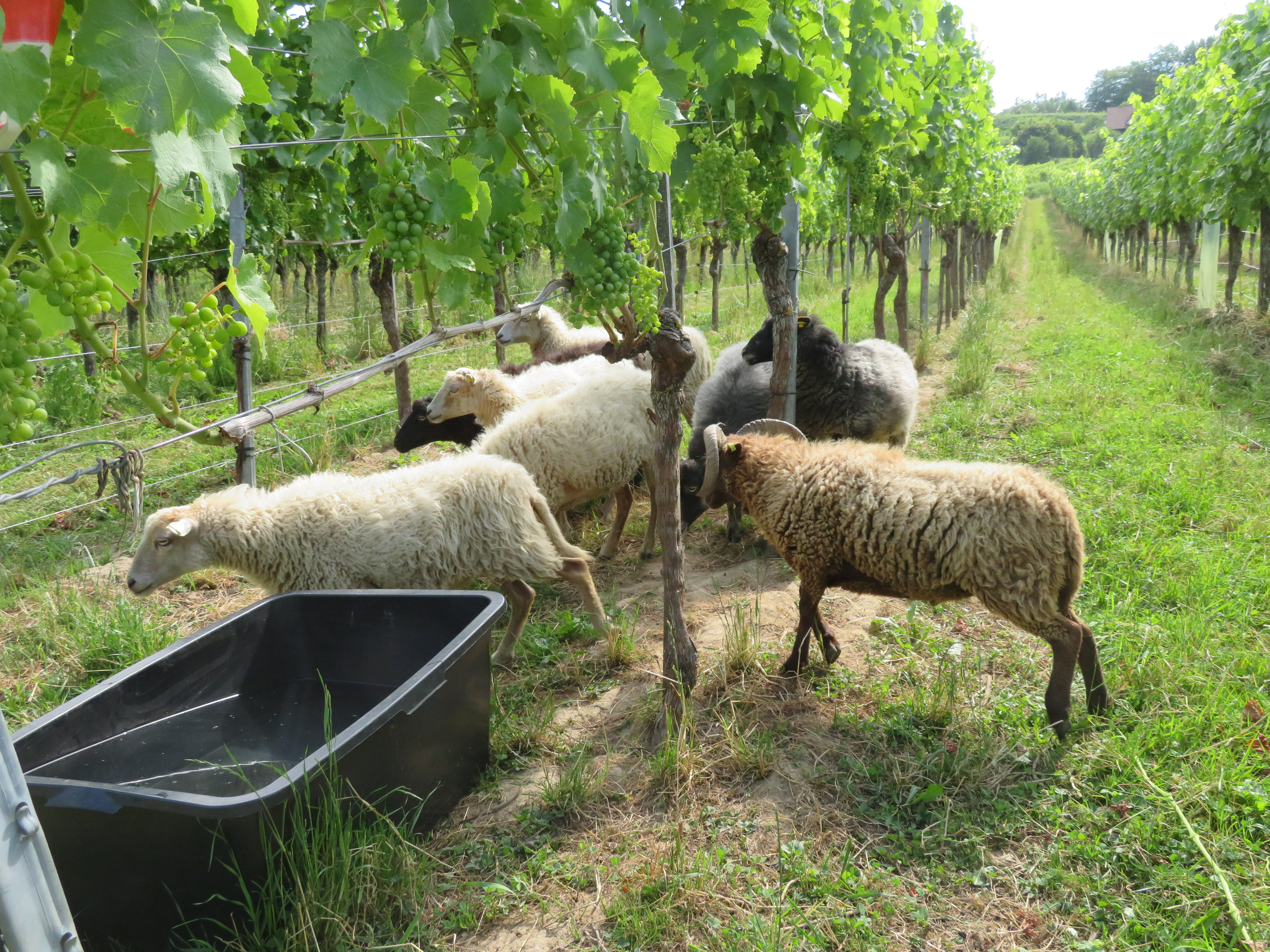
Sheep of the breed Ouessant sheep in a vineyard.

Integrated sheep-vineyard system, sheep in vineyard or sheep in viticulture, are terms used to describe a dual-purpose agricultural system that is used internationally, albeit rarely. Although viticulture stays the primary economic focus, the integration of sheep sets this form of agricultural use apart from conventional viticultural systems, not least because it often requires some adjustments to vine training. The use of sheep in viticulture can increase land use efficiency, as it produces not only wine (grapes) but also sheep products as well as ecosystem services. However, the actual use of sheep in vineyards is widely restricted in terms of time and space by the widespread use of pesticides in viticulture.

The first use of grazing sheep in viticulture has been documented and scientifically tested in New Zealand. The introduction of sheep in viticulture is being researched internationally.

== Risks to sheep health and viticultural practice ==
The use of sheep in vineyards is not possible in many places, or only possible within narrow time limits, due to veterinary concerns and proven risks to animal health. Of particular importance is the life-threatening danger to sheep posed by copper, a fungicide used in various regions of the world. Unlike other mammals, sheep are extremely sensitive to copper. In organic viticulture, copper-based preparations are the only approved highly effective fungicides. In many cases, their use is indispensable in organic viticulture, especially in relatively rainy regions, due to the high fungal pressure (e.g., downy mildew). When copper-based sprays are applied to the vines, the copper concentration in the vine leaves exceeds the limits tolerated by the sheep organism many times at least for weeks. Excessive copper levels can also occur in the accompanying vegetation (plants under the vines) that is grazed. This is not only the case when copper preparations are currently being applied. The copper content of the accompanying vegetation can exceed tolerable limits for sheep throughout the year, even if copper is no longer being used in the vineyard. The cause of this are historical applications, in some cases dating back decades. Measurement methods and thresholds of copper levels for grazed biomass are described in literature.

In addition to copper, other plant protection products used in viticulture surely also pose risks to sheep health, but the dangers to animal health have not been adequately investigated so far. The use of pesticides varies in wine-growing regions around the world and is based, among other things, on fungal pressure, which is significantly higher in regions with relatively high rainfall. In addition to the real danger to animal health, the lack of knowledge is a major obstacle to the use of sheep in viticulture.

In addition to veterinary concerns, caring for the animals requires working time—at least if the animals are owned by the winery itself and not in cooperation with a shepherd. The risk of excessive defoliation of the vines due to grazing can, in principle, be controlled by choosing the grazing period, the breed, by installing electrical wires or adjustments of the viticultural training systems. There are various implementation options, but damage to the vines cannot be completely ruled out.

By grazing, the animals can take over various viticultural tasks that would otherwise be essential for the wineries' work (e.g., weed control). Necessary adjustments to vine training systems are minimal, when sheep only graze outside the vegetation period. However, if grazing also takes place during the vegetation period, i.e., when the vines are leafy, it may be necessary to adapt the training system. In principle, unripe berries are not eaten by sheep over a relatively long period of development, but excessive defoliation of the vines or the intake of the inflorescences can become problematic for viticultural aims. Some forms of vine training, such as bush training, which is common in Mediterranean climates, are generally not suitable for grazing during the vegetation period. Others, in which the leaf-bearing shoots of the vines are relatively high, are in principle more suitable and require only minor adjustments of the training system.

== Advantages for viticulture, biodiversity, and land use efficiency ==
Sheep can potentially replace the regulation of accompanying vegetation (otherwise: repeated mulching), undervine management (disc plow or herbicides), and the removal of unwanted low shoots and leaves from the grape zone (manual defoliation, mechanical removal) through their grazing. At least in theory, this can save labor and machine time. This could potentially minimize the use of fossil resources (diesel for machines). In addition, sheep are popular and can be used in wine marketing. Since the accompanying vegetation in vineyards can be very vigorous depending on the region and season, it could also be valuable for sheep breeding (meat, wool, offspring).

Compared to viticulture without grazing animals, the introduction of sheep can contribute to nature conservation. This is especially the case for dung beetles and, at least, when otherwise underutilized marginal structures are also maintained by the sheep. In this case, there is scientific proof that wild bees can be promoted and unwanted scrub encroachment, for example on vineyard slopes, can be reduced. The actual effects on the biodiversity of the vineyard ultimately depend primarily on the grazing period.

A study conducted in a Mediterranean climate for showed that the use of sheep outside the vegetation period had only a minor impact on CO2 equivalent emissions. The quality of the grapes was not affected by this grazing.

== Other grazing animals in vineyards ==
In addition to sheep, dual-purpose systems involving Runner ducks, geese, chickens, and even cows are sometimes used in viticulture. The possibility of using other animals surely depends primarily on the potential damage, which in turn is strongly determined by the vine training system. E.g., due to their high grazing intensity, cows are certainly only conceivable outside the growing season. Documentation or even scientific studies on the use of other animal species are lacking.
