= Perendale =

New Zealand breed of sheep

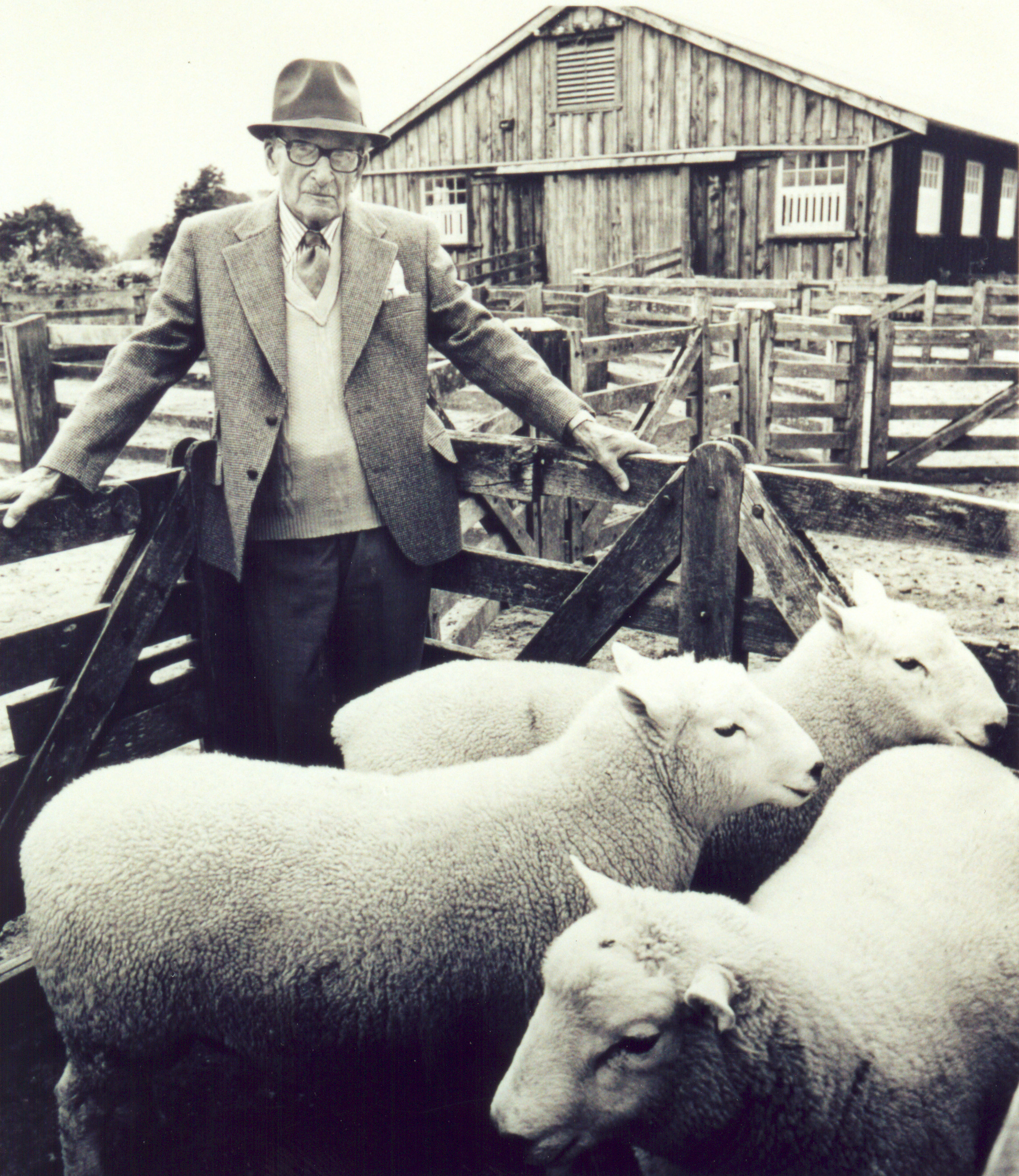
- Sir Geoffrey Peren with perendale sheep, 1978
- Country of origin: New Zealand
- Use: meat; wool

The Perendale is a breed of sheep developed in New Zealand by Massey Agricultural College (now Massey University) for use in steep hill situations. The breed is named after Sir Geoffrey Peren, and it achieves its aims by being the offspring of Romney ewes and Cheviot rams with sturdy legs. It is raised primarily for meat. It was originally developed as a dual-purpose breed and has many characteristics of a longwool sheep, with an staple length of 5-6" and an open, even crimp.

== History ==
Since the early 1980s, the flock numbers of this sheep has increased, mainly because hill-country farming has increased and they are more adaptable to the terrain. Developed from the Cheviot and Romney, the Perendale is a dual-purpose sheep producing wool fibres of 29 to 35 micrometres (0.0011 to 0.0014 in) diameter with a 125 millimetres (4.9 in) staple length. The Perendale is characteristically a high fertility animal, and has great potential to produce a prime ewe lamb when crossed with the Merino. As a purebred, its hardiness makes it ideally suited to colder, high-rainfall areas. The Perendale is easy to care for; the ewes have little trouble lambing and are good mothers.

Handspinners played a notable role in establishing the breed in North America. It was introduced from New Zealand as early as 1977 and continues to be bred with imported semen, but remains a relatively rare breed.

== Characteristics ==
The mature body weight of a ram is 220 to 260 lb (100 to 118 kg) and a ewe is 120 to 150 lb (54 to 68 kg). The average fiber diameter is 29 to 35 microns. The USDA wool grade is 44's to 54's.
