= Kemp (wool) =

Fibers found in the fleece of some sheep

Kemp is a brittle, weak fibre forming the residual traces of a secondary coat in some breeds of sheep, which may be mixed with normal fibres in a wool fleece. This hair is not desirable in a fleece, as it does not accept dye, minimizing both the quality and the value of the wool. Kemp fibre is also hollow, which is the reason it does not hold dye. There are three parts to kemp. First is the root, which is often frayed and swollen and has completed its growth or has already been shed. Second is a clear transparent section, and third is central core surround by a clear coat which takes up the majority of the fibre.
