= Fédération Cynologique Internationale Agility World Championships =

Highest level competition for dog agility

The Fédération Cynologique Internationale Agility World Championships ('FCI Agility World Championships') is an annual dog agility competition sanctioned by Fédération Cynologique Internationale.

== Medalists ==
=== Individual Small ===
Year	Location	Gold	Silver	Bronze
1996	(Switzerland) Morges	(Netherlands) Hilda Schriek, Sinphonie of the Happy Voice, Shetland Sheepdog	(Denmark) Tina-Maria Jörgensen, Nellie, Shetland Sheepdog	(Switzerland) Brigitte Rüegg, Balou Crespo, Poodle
1997	(Denmark) Copenhagen	(France) Christophe Dalmat, Gwendy Silver De Furioso, Schnauzer	(Belgium) Rene Carpels, Black Symphony van Claudia's Love, Shetland Sheepdog	(Luxembourg) Fabienne Thines, Rico, Shetland Sheepdog
1998	(Slovenia) Maribor	(Finland) Pulli Sirpa, Achilles, Shetland Sheepdog	(Finland) Mika Mättö, Harry, Welsh Terrier	(Spain) Peregrina Saavedra Garcia, Spanish Style's Blue Baby, Shetland Sheepdog
1999	(Germany) Dortmund	(Finland) Mika Mättö, Harry, Welsh Terrier	(Denmark) Maj-Brit Crone Petersen, Shamirosa's Stephinie, Shetland Sheepdog	(Finland) Janne Karstunen, Anni, Border Terrier
2000	(Finland) Helsinki	(Spain) Peregrina Saavedra Garcia, Spanish Style's Blue Baby, Shetland Sheepdog	(Finland) Marjut Pulli, Niki, Shetland Sheepdog	(Spain) Canovas Francisco Munoz, Ara, Yorkshire Terrier
2001	(Portugal) Porto	(Russia) Elena Klokova, Diamond Crown Bidzh Nigel's, Poodle	(France) Sylvain Jacquemin, Mira des Drayeres, Pyrenean Sheepdog	(Russia) Svetlana Tumanova, Bonya, Spitz
2002	(Germany) Dortmund	(United States) Erin Schaefer, Mach, Shetland Sheepdog	(Switzerland) Sep Cadalbert, Bandit Croix la Pierre Belami, Papillon dog	(Switzerland) Cornelia Schmid, Dream Firl, Shetland Sheepdog
2003	(France) Lievin	(Russia) Svetlana Tumanova, Bonya, Spitz	(Switzerland) Martin Eberle, Pebbles, Poodle	(Russia) Elena Klokova, Diamond Crown Bidzh Nigel's, Poodle
2004	(Italy) Montichiari	(Netherlands) Natasja Kelders, Djoura, Shetland Sheepdog	(Spain) Antonio Molina Aragones, Tebas de Chipirrusquis, Miniature Schnauzer	(Russia) Varvara Kataeva, Tissan Yustas, Shetland Sheepdog
2005	(Spain) Valladolid	(Russia) Anguelina Katutis, Barbari's Skay Paynery, Shetland Sheepdog	(Switzerland) Martin Eberle, Pebbles, Poodle	(Switzerland) Cornelia Schmid, Dream Firl, Shetland Sheepdog
2006	(Switzerland) Basil	(Switzerland) Martin Eberle, Pebbles, Poodle	(Russia) Svetlana Tumanova, Bonya, Spitz	(Latvia) Svetlana Kreslina, Fly, Shetland Sheepdog
2007	(Norway) Hamar	(Czech Republic) Adéla Králová, Rupione-Baby, Shetland Sheepdog	(Switzerland) Martin Eberle, Pebbles, Poodle	(France) Christophe Dalmat, Theo, Poodle
2008	(Finland) Helsinki	(United States) Marcy Mantell, Wave, Shetland Sheepdog	(Switzerland) Martin Eberle, Pebbles, Poodle	(Sweden) Asa Söderman, Erik, Shetland Sheepdog
2009	(Austria) Dornbirn	(Finland) Carolina Pellikka, Kerttu, Shetland Sheepdog	(Slovenia) Urša Krenk, Lu, Poodle	(Belgium) Ronald Vlemincx, Cali, Shetland Sheepdog
2010	(Germany) Rieden	(Canada) Jessica Martin, Dice, Shetland Sheepdog	(Czech Republic) Veronika Krcmarova, Kvido, Parson Russell Terrier	(France) Nadine Hunsperger, Q, Shetland Sheepdog
2011	(France) Lievin	(Italy) Nicola Giraudi, Twister, Parson Russell Terrier	(Japan) Maho Yamaguchi, Suzuka Grandprix, Shetland Sheepdog	(United Kingdom) Bernadette Bay, Obay, Shetland Sheepdog
2012	(Czech Republic) Liberec	(Russia) Elena Kapustina, Party, Parson Russell Terrier	(Germany) Tobias Wüst, Peanut, Shetland Sheepdog	(Denmark) Natasha Gjerulff, Primadonna, Shetland Sheepdog
2013	(South Africa) Johannesburg	(Switzerland) Conny Spengler, Baldur, Papillon dog	(United States) Kaye Korey, Kaemon, Shetland Sheepdog	(Austria) Silke Weich, Chancy, Shetland Sheepdog
2014	(Luxembourg) Kirchberg	(Germany) Paul Hirning, Jet, Shetland Sheepdog	(Switzerland) Martin Eberle, Eyleen, Shetland Sheepdog	(Slovenia) Roland Kolenko, Kira, Parson Russell Terrier
2015	(Italy) Bologna	(Italy) Vlad Ciprian Stefanut, Heisse Liebe, Parson Russell Terrier	(Slovenia) Roland Kolenko, Ammy, Parson Russell Terrier	(Brazil) Laila Samir Abu, Lali, Parson Russell Terrier
2016	(Spain) Saragozza	(Germany) Tobias Wüst, Peanut, Shetland Sheepdog	(Switzerland) Martin Eberle, Eyleen, Shetland Sheepdog	(Slovenia) Roland Kolenko, Ammy, Parson Russell Terrier
2017	(Czech Republic) Liberec	(Germany) Tobias Wüst, Dörte, Shetland Sheepdog	(Sweden) Sandra Sjöberg, Mila, Shetland Sheepdog	(Norway) Eli Beathe Saether, Zelda, Shetland Sheepdog
2018	(Norway) Kristianstad	(Denmark) Natasha Gjerulff, Moviestar, Shetland Sheepdog	(Germany) Tobias Wüst, Dörte, Shetland Sheepdog	(Slovakia) Pavol Vakonic, Meryl, Shetland Sheepdog
2019	(Finland) Turku	(Germany) Tobias Wüst, Dörte, Shetland Sheepdog	(Estonia) Marta Miil, Jay, Shetland Sheepdog	(France) Julien Orand, Orand, Shetland Sheepdog
2022	(Austria) Schwechat	(Germany) Stefanie Simson, Bibi, Shetland Sheepdog	(France) Maxime Parraud, Cute, Shetland Sheepdog	(United Kingdom) Martin Reid, Selfie, Shetland Sheepdog
2023	(Czech Republic) Liberec	(Norway) Kjersti Jørgensen, Agi, Shetland Sheepdog	(Norway) Eli Beathe Saether, Xera, Shetland Sheepdog	(Germany) Tobias Wüst, Dörte, Shetland Sheepdog
2024	(Belgium) Opglabbeek	(Poland) Paulina Duda, Huzi, Parson Russell Terrier	(United Kingdom) Martin Reid, Selfie, Shetland Sheepdog	(Finland) Iida Vakkuri, Helka, Shetland Sheepdog
2025	(Sweden) Kalmar	(Switzerland) Simon Tabourat, Lewis, Shetland Sheepdog	(United Kingdom) Martin Reid, Selfie, Shetland Sheepdog	(Germany) Silas Boogk, Gadget, Shetland Sheepdog

=== Individual Medium ===
Year	Location	Gold	Silver	Bronze
2002	(Germany) Dortmund	(Finland) Kaisa Eskola, Lurvendhalis Deanora, Kromfohrländer	(Denmark) Tina Mette Jörgensen, Chester, Shetland Sheepdog	(Netherlands) Willem-Alexander Kelders, Jackie, Shetland Sheepdog
2003	(France) Lievin	(Slovenia) Silvia Trkman, Simply the Best, Pyrenean Sheepdog	(Czech Republic) Olga Edrová, Adder Black, Shetland Sheepdog	(Denmark) Jorgen Dreymann, Toby, Shetland Sheepdog
2004	(Italy) Montichiari	(Belgium) Johan Renders, Flurk, Jagdterrier	(France) Sylvain Jacquemin, Mira des Drayeres, Pyrenean Sheepdog	(Belgium) Ivo Tielens, Yipke, Shetland Sheepdog
2005	(Spain) Valladolid	(Slovenia) Silvia Trkman, Simply the Best, Pyrenean Sheepdog	(Belgium) Gert Danckaers, Ytosca, Poodle	(Belgium) Ivo Tielens, Yipke, Shetland Sheepdog
2006	(Switzerland) Basil	(Finland) Jari Suomalainen, Frodo Bromus, Kooikerhondje	(United States) Jennifer Crank, Guess, Shetland Sheepdog	(Luxembourg) Patrick Krier, Angie, Nova Scotia Duck Tolling Retriever
2007	(Norway) Hamar	(Switzerland) Anton Zürcher, Witch, Border Collie	(Switzerland) Irene Bannwart, Debro, Shetland Sheepdog	(United States) Jennifer Crank, Guess, Shetland Sheepdog
2008	(Finland) Helsinki	(Switzerland) Anton Zürcher, Witch, Border Collie	(Germany) Stephanie Tiemann, Chilly, Manchester Terrier	(Russia) Svetlana Tumanova, Tory, Shetland Sheepdog
2009	(Austria) Dornbirn	(United Kingdom) Natasha Wise, Dizzy, Border Collie	(Switzerland) Anton Zürcher, Witch, Border Collie	(Belgium) Johan Vos, Birko, Shetland Sheepdog
2010	(Germany) Rieden	(United Kingdom) Natasha Wise, Dizzy, Border Collie	(United States) John Nys, Rush, Shetland Sheepdog	(Finland) Jari Suomalainen, Frodo Bromus, Kooikerhondje
2011	(France) Lievin	(United States) Ashley Deacon, Luka De La Brise, Pyrenean Sheepdog	(France) Thomas Raczka, Curly, Pyrenean Sheepdog	(Slovenia) Silvia Trkman, Simply the Best, Pyrenean Sheepdog
2012	(Czech Republic) Liberec	(United Kingdom) Natasha Wise, Dizzy, Border Collie	(Czech Republic) Petra Hamšíková, Lara, Shetland Sheepdog	(Slovenia) Silvia Trkman, Simply the Best, Pyrenean Sheepdog
2013	(South Africa) Johannesburg	(Spain) David Molina Gimeno, Fran, Spanish Water Dog	(Switzerland) Tina Minuz, Peewee, Schapendoes	(Switzerland) Brigitt Braun, Roxy, Manchester Terrier
2014	(Luxembourg) Kirchberg	(Czech Republic) Martina Magnoli Klimesova, Kiki, Mudi	(Austria) Werner Goltz, Esmeralda, Kromfohrländer	(Finland) Outi Harju, Olli, Kooikerhondje
2015	(Italy) Bologna	(Slovenia) Silvia Trkman, Le, Pyrenean Sheepdog	(Belgium) Andy De Groote, Deedee, Border Collie	(Germany) Daniel Schröder, Nick, Shetland Sheepdog
2016	(Spain) Saragozza	(Czech Republic) Martina Magnoli Klimesova, Kiki, Mudi	(France) Thomas Raczka, Curly, Pyrenean Sheepdog	(Finland) Sanni Kariniemi, Goa, Shetland Sheepdog
2017	(Czech Republic) Liberec	(Germany) Daniel Schröder, Cashew, Shetland Sheepdog	(Czech Republic) Kateřina Malačková, Izzy, Pyrenean Sheepdog	(Russia) Svetlana Gushchina, Tory, Border Collie
2018	(Norway) Kristianstad	(Czech Republic) Martina Magnoli Klimesova, Kiki, Mudi	(United States) Jennifer Crank, Guess, Shetland Sheepdog	(Poland) Magdalena Domanska, Mora, Pyrenean Sheepdog
2019	(Finland) Turku	(Germany) Silas Boogk, Beam, Shetland Sheepdog	(Sweden) Anne Karlsson, Bonnie, Mudi	(Austria) Tamara Sedlmaier, You, Shetland Sheepdog
2022	(Austria) Schwechat	(Germany) Daniel Schröder, Cashew, Shetland Sheepdog	(Germany) Silas Boogk, Beam, Shetland Sheepdog	(Brazil) Felipe Minet, Corah, Mudi
2023	(Czech Republic) Liberec	(Czech Republic) Aneta Obrusnikova, Chilli, Mudi	(United Kingdom) James Adams, Willow, Cocker Spaniel	(Poland) Magdalena Gadomska, Kudel, Poodle
2024	(Belgium) Opglabbeek	(Italy) Martina Magnoli Klimesova, Malinka, Mudi	(Switzerland) André Mühlebach, Air, Border Collie	(France) Jessica Flouret, Kira, Australian Kelpie
2025	(Sweden) Kalmar	(Germany) Tobias Wüst, Mercedes, Shetland Sheepdog	(United States) Casey Keller, Fidget, Cocker Spaniel	(Latvia) Svetlana Kreslina, Panther, Shetland Sheepdog

=== Individual Intermediate ===
Year	Location	Gold	Silver	Bronze
2023	(Czech Republic) Liberec	(United Kingdom) Dalton Meredith, Clippy, Border Collie	(Denmark) Channie Elmestedt, Fame, Border Collie	(Lithuania) Gerda Žemaitytė, Lee, Border Collie
2024	(Belgium) Opglabbeek	(Poland) Iwona Golab, SeeYa, Border Collie	(United Kingdom) Dalton Meredith, Clippy, Border Collie	(Finland) Bianca van Gastel, Ffenics, Border Collie
2025	(Sweden) Kalmar	(United States) Kris Seiter, Naavdanya, Border Collie	(Spain) Michel Menez de Freitas, Jakka, Border Collie	(Finland) Bianca van Gastel, Ffenics, Border Collie

=== Individual Large ===
Year	Location	Gold	Silver	Bronze
1996	(Switzerland) Morges	(Luxembourg) Fernand Eiffes, Quiff, Border Collie	(Belgium) Eddy Danau, Mancunian Pasha, Border Collie	(France) Didier Guimard, Jet, Tervuren
1997	(Denmark) Copenhagen	(Switzerland) Marco Mouwen, Amazing, Border Collie	(France) Gérard Mousse, Jordan, Beauceron	(Belgium) Tilda Jacobs, Rose, Border Collie
1998	(Slovenia) Maribor	(Switzerland) Claude Singy, Inka, Tervuren	(Netherlands) Wilco van Tellingen, Flash, Border Collie	(Netherlands) Henri van Steenis, Mitchell, Border Collie
1999	(Germany) Dortmund	(France) Christine Charpentier, Loch Mac Leod, Border Collie	(Belgium) Guy Blancke, Unia d'Aljepalo, Groenendael	(Germany) Sylvia Vaanholt, Nico, Border Collie
2000	(Finland) Helsinki	(France) Christine Charpentier, Loch Mac Leod, Border Collie	(France) Patrick Servais, Moment Du Chene De Montels, Border Collie	(Germany) Hinky Nickels, Quick, Border Collie
2001	(Portugal) Porto	(Sweden) Jenny Damm, Salts Joborgs Lotus, Border Collie	(France) Patrice Willaume, Noun du Lur'Yano, Briard	(Belgium) Sally Andrews, Udine Daley, Border Collie
2002	(Germany) Dortmund	(France) Olivier Adyns, Onyx, Border Collie	(Austria) Sonja Mladek, Jason of Jennifer's Bonefire, Border Collie	(United Kingdom) Nicola Garrett, Hocus Pocus, Border Collie
2003	(France) Lievin	(Finland) Mikko Aaltonen, Tarkatan Aqua, Tervuren	(Finland) Juha Orenius, Uranos, Border Collie	(Italy) Fabio Stabile, Rush, Border Collie
2004	(Italy) Montichiari	(France) Christelle Bouillot, Phidjy, Border Collie	(United Kingdom) Greg Derrett, GT, Border Collie	(Italy) Ezio Bertuletti, Penelope Cruz, Border Collie
2005	(Spain) Valladolid	(Germany) Sylvia Vaanholt, Amazing Gill, Border Collie	(Germany) Florian Cerny, Lass, Border Collie	(United Kingdom) Dave Munnings, Billy, Border Collie
2006	(Switzerland) Basil	(Denmark) Sarah Lorentzen, Simic, Border Collie	(Hungary) Anna Eifert, Nevian, Border Collie	(Germany) Sylvia Vaanholt, Amazing Gill, Border Collie
2007	(Norway) Hamar	(Switzerland) Sandra Ulmer, Seven, Border Collie	(Germany) Florian Cerny, Lass, Border Collie	(Russia) Svetlana Tumanova, Arago, Border Collie
2008	(Finland) Helsinki	(United States) Marcus Topps, Juice, Border Collie	(Norway) Jan Egil Eide, Circus, Malinois dog	(Finland) Jouni Orenius, Yoko, Border Collie
2009	(Austria) Dornbirn	(Austria) Lisa Frick, Hoss, Border Collie	(United States) Marcus Topps, Juice, Border Collie	(Austria) Susanne Novak, Minn, Border Collie
2010	(Germany) Rieden	(Austria) Lisa Frick, Hoss, Border Collie	(United Kingdom) Dave Munnings, Dobby, Border Collie	(Italy) Andrea Ochini, Gio, Border Collie
2011	(France) Lievin	(Netherlands) Roy Fonteijn, Flinn, Border Collie	(Finland) Tuulia Liuhto, Promillen Cinzano, Border Collie	(Russia) Elena Kochetova, Wi, Border Collie
2012	(Czech Republic) Liberec	(Austria) Lisa Frick, Hoss, Border Collie	(France) Gregory Bielle Bidalot, Cayenne, Border Collie	(Germany) Philipp Müller Schnick, Heat, Border Collie
2013	(South Africa) Johannesburg	(Austria) Helmut Paulik, Lane, Border Collie	(Czech Republic) Radovan Liska, Ory, Border Collie	(Germany) Philipp Müller Schnick, Heat, Border Collie
2014	(Luxembourg) Kirchberg	(Austria) Lisa Frick, Hoss, Border Collie	(Sweden) Jenny Damm, Miss Lilli, Border Collie	(United States) Desiree Snelleman, Pace, Border Collie
2015	(Italy) Bologna	(Slovakia) Pavol Vakonic, Fly, Border Collie	(Slovakia) Pavol Vakonic, Ikea, Border Collie	(Sweden) Jouni Orenius, Neela, Border Collie
2016	(Spain) Saragozza	(Germany) Anne Lenz, Chi, Border Collie	(Argentina) Romina Cervasio, Wish, Border Collie	(France) Adrien Grespier, Gumball, Border Collie
2017	(Czech Republic) Liberec	(Czech Republic) Tereza Králová, Say, Border Collie	(Hungary) Anita Szilágyi, Dita, Border Collie	(France) Nicola Giraudi, Eira, Border Collie
2018	(Norway) Kristianstad	(France) Nicola Giraudi, Eira, Border Collie	(Germany) Anne Lenz, Itzi Bitzi, Border Collie	(United Kingdom) Dave Munnings, Fame, Border Collie
2019	(Finland) Turku	(Russia) Stanislav Kurochkin, Zippi, Border Collie	(Luxembourg) Mike Peter, Limit, Border Collie	(Italy) Gianluca Schingaro, Ex, Border Collie
2022	(Austria) Schwechat	(France) Kevin Odile, Move, Border Collie	(Czech Republic) Lucie Glejdurová, Twix, Border Collie	(Italy) Martina Magnoli Klimesova, Nemi, Border Collie
2023	(Czech Republic) Liberec	(Italy) Veronica Odone, Skill, Border Collie	(United Kingdom) Naarah Cuddy, Lemon, Border Collie	(Hungary) Zsófia Timea Richter-Sallay, Rira, Border Collie
2024	(Belgium) Opglabbeek	(Spain) Adrian Bajo, Gif, Border Collie	(France) Nicola Giraudi, Brant, Border Collie	(United Kingdom) Naarah Cuddy, Lemon, Border Collie
2025	(Sweden) Kalmar	(Austria) Lara Heinzel, Miyu, Border Collie	(United Kingdom) Shannon Springford, Banter, Border Collie	(Spain) Iban Cubedo Alcazar, Dash, Border Collie

=== Team Small ===
Year	Location	Gold	Silver	Bronze
1996	(Switzerland) Morges	(Denmark) Anette Jörgensen, Aiki, Shetland Sheepdog, Maj-Brit Crone Petersen, Zigga, Poodle, Tina-Maria Jörgensen, Nellie, Shetland Sheepdog, Tina-Mette Jörgensen, Jumper, Shetland Sheepdog	(Finland) Eeva Ekholm, Cariboa, Poodle, Janne Karstunen, Anni, Border Terrier, Tina Koskinen, Yazinas Crokus, Shetland Sheepdog, Eija Kamppinen, Chirpy, Cavalier King Charles Spaniel	(Belgium) Jacques Vereyken, Qanana, Cocker Spaniel, Ides Van Heghe, Prince, Shetland Sheepdog, Resi Gommeren, Misjka, Beagle, Mark Colemont, Black Schippy, Shetland Sheepdog
1997	(Denmark) Copenhagen	(Denmark) Anette Jörgensen, Aiki, Shetland Sheepdog, Maj-Brit Crone Petersen, Zigga, Poodle, Tina-Maria Jörgensen, Nellie, Shetland Sheepdog, Tina-Mette Jörgensen, Jumper, Shetland Sheepdog	(Finland) Janne Karstunen, Anni, Border Terrier, Tina Koskinen, Yazinas Crokus, Shetland Sheepdog, Tuija Saari, Lulu, Border Terrier, Marko Lindlöf, Postaasi, Border Terrier	(Norway) Alina B. Lundkvist, Fredrikke, Shetland Sheepdog, Ingrid Froysa, Witch, Shetland Sheepdog, Elisabeth Wilhelmsen, Beauty, Shetland Sheepdog, Jan Eric Östvang, Little Majas, Shetland Sheepdog
1998	(Slovenia) Maribor	(United States) Judy Heller, Trinity Little Howler, Shetland Sheepdog, Diane Bauman, Patriot Piper, Cocker Spaniel, Marietta Huber, Squiggles, Beagle, Katherine Leggett, Marshland, Shetland Sheepdog	(Denmark) Anette Jörgensen, Devin, Shetland Sheepdog, Maj-Brit Crone Petersen, Zari, Shetland Sheepdog, Kjaer Nanna Holt, Tilda, Shetland Sheepdog, Niels Steen Hansen, Shadow, Poodle	(Finland) Janne Karstunen, Ava, Border Terrier, Harri Aaltonen, Torbero, Shetland Sheepdog, Pulli Sirpa, Achilles, Shetland Sheepdog, Mika Mättö, Harry, Welsh Terrier
1999	(Germany) Dortmund	(France) Christophe Dalmat, Gwendy, Schnauzer, Sylvain Jacquemin, Mira des Drayeres, Pyrenean Sheepdog, Gérard Nizet, Helse, Pyrenean Sheepdog, Gilles Chenart, Jaffar, Boston Terrier	(Denmark) Maj-Brit Crone Petersen, Zari, Shetland Sheepdog, Tina-Maria Jörgensen, Nellie, Shetland Sheepdog, Niels Steen Hansen, Shadow, Poodle, Inge Daae Fagerberg, Bori, Shetland Sheepdog	(Finland) Janne Karstunen, Anni, Border Terrier, Mika Mättö, Harry, Welsh Terrier, Petteri Huotari, Wilma, Border Terrier, Jaana Lindfors, Jade, Border Terrier
2000	(Finland) Helsinki	(Finland) Janne Karstunen, Anni, Border Terrier, Marjut Pulli, Niki, Shetland Sheepdog, Mikko Grönqvist, Sannariina, Kromfohrländer, Jan Vesalehto, Peltsun, Shetland Sheepdog	(United States) Diane Bauman, Patriot Piper, Cocker Spaniel, Barbara Lombard, Joy's, Shetland Sheepdog, Barbara Davis, Strathspey, Shetland Sheepdog, Katherine Leggett, Marshland, Shetland Sheepdog	(Czech Republic) Martina Podestovà, Gwendolyn, Shetland Sheepdog, Radovan Liska, Baronesse, Shetland Sheepdog, Dana Sedlàkovà, Sting, Shetland Sheepdog, Kristyna Bartosovà, Abraham, Beagle
2001	(Portugal) Porto	(Finland) Jaana Lindfors, Jade, Border Terrier, Jan Vesalehto, Peltsun, Shetland Sheepdog, Anja Lehtio, Kaukaristan, Shetland Sheepdog, Mikko Grönqvist, Sannariina, Kromfohrländer	(United States) Barbara Davis, Strathspey, Shetland Sheepdog, Erin Schaefer, Mach, Shetland Sheepdog, Jean Lavalley, Cheer, Shetland Sheepdog, Joan Meyer, Dustin, Shetland Sheepdog	(Sweden) Maria Ekstrom, Siri, Shetland Sheepdog, Marie Jansson, Hedvig, Poodle, Christina Beskow, Tess, Staffordshire Bull Terrier, Emma Celander, Aladdin, Border Terrier
2002	(Germany) Dortmund	(Russia) Svetlana Tumanova, Bonya, Spitz, Varvara Kataeva, Tissan Yustas, Shetland Sheepdog, Maria Tomilova, Shandor, German Spitz	(United States) Cheryl Fischer, Bombadil, Papillon dog, Katherine Leggett, Marshland, Shetland Sheepdog, Erin Schaefer, Mach, Shetland Sheepdog	(Switzerland) Cornelia Schmid, Dream Firl, Shetland Sheepdog, Sep Cadalbert, Croix la Pierre Belami, Papillon dog, Sandra Ulmer, Windy Nights Kir Royal, Poodle
2003	(France) Lievin	(Switzerland) Cornelia Schmid, Dream Firl, Shetland Sheepdog, Sep Cadalbert, Croix la Pierre Belami, Papillon dog, Sandra Ulmer, Windy Nights Kir Royal, Poodle	(Spain) Antonio Molina Aragones, Livinia, Zwergschnauzer, Antonio Molina Aragones, Tebas de Chipirrusquis, Zwergschnauzer, Ana Bustamante, Duna, Poodle	(Latvia) Svetlana Vanusina, Hearty Sportstwo, Shetland Sheepdog, Inguna Osis, Hildebert's, Miniature Schnauzer, Lidija Belajeva, Scandy, Shetland Sheepdog
2004	(Italy) Montichiari	(Russia) Anguelina Katutis, David, Welsh Terrier, Varvara Kataeva, Tissan Yustas, Shetland Sheepdog, Svetlana Tumanova, Bonya, Spitz	(Czech Republic) Antonin Divis, Suzanne, Shetland Sheepdog, Radovan Liska, Nessie, Shetland Sheepdog, Eva Lacnaková, Orka, Shetland Sheepdog	(Spain) Antonio Molina Aragones, Tebas de Chipirrusquis, Zwergschnauzer, Josep Boix Belaguer, Fosca, Shetland Sheepdog, Antonio Molina Aragones, Livinia, Zwergschnauzer
2005	(Spain) Valladolid	(Switzerland) Cornelia Schmid, Dream Firl, Shetland Sheepdog, Martin Eberle, Pebbles, Poodle, Luigi Cavallo, Havanne, Poodle	(Russia) Svetlana Tumanova, Bonya, Spitz, Varvara Kataeva, Tissan Yustas, Shetland Sheepdog, Natalia Sternberg, Tissan, Shetland Sheepdog	(Spain) Antonio Molina Aragones, Tebas de Chipirrusquis, Zwergschnauzer, Antonio Molina Aragones, Livinia, Zwergschnauzer, Alex Paola, Linda, Poodle
2006	(Switzerland) Basil	(Czech Republic) Olga Edrová, Enticing Eve, Shetland Sheepdog, Adéla Kralova, Rupione-Baby, Shetland Sheepdog, Eva Lacnakova, Orka, Shetland Sheepdog	(Switzerland) Martin Eberle, Pebbles, Poodle, Regula Bersinger, Shamu, Kooikerhondje, Regula Tschanz-Haas, Dale, Shetland Sheepdog	(Germany) Daniel Schröder, Chip, Shetland Sheepdog, Anne Großler, Faible, Parson Russell Terrier, Uschi Sattler, Always Suger, Parson Russell Terrier
2007	(Norway) Hamar	(France) Caroline Doumergue, Une etoile filante, Cavalier King Charles Spaniel, Adyns Joffrey, U2, Shetland Sheepdog, Christophe Dalmat, Theo, Poodle	(Switzerland) Regula Bersinger, Shamu, Kooikerhondje, Dania Ehrsam, Blade, Shetland Sheepdog, Martin Eberle, Pebbles, Poodle	(Finland) Mia Borg, Pyry, Border Terrier, Taina Airaksinen, Muska, Poodle, Anu Rajaheimo, Pirre, Shetland Sheepdog
2008	(Finland) Helsinki	(Brazil) Alexander Schcolnir, Skipper, Shetland Sheepdog, Katia Cilene da Silva, Candy, Shetland Sheepdog, Paulo Rogerio Prado, Blanka, Shetland Sheepdog	(Russia) Darya Ponomareva, Napoleon, German Spitz, Ekaterina Zakharova, Sandy, Shetland Sheepdog, Svetlana Tumanova, Bonya, German Spitz	(United Kingdom) David Alderson Libby Poodle, Nicola Garrett Indiana, Shetland Sheepdog, Rachel Mowbray, Nutmeg, Border Terrier
2009	(Austria) Dornbirn	(Russia) Darya Ponomareva, Napoleon, German Spitz, Svetlana Tumanova, Bonya, German Spitz, Natalia Sternberg, Knopa, Shetland Sheepdog	(Sweden) Åsa Söderman, Erik, Shetland Sheepdog, Eva Leandersson, Maja, Shetland Sheepdog, Patrik Rosendal, Ina, Shetland Sheepdog	(Italy) Diego Picardo, Exordium Bigsexy-N, Poodle, Ivana Sipalova, Nyo, Jack Russell Terrier, Elisa Solerio, Patch, Jack Russell Terrier
2010	(Germany) Rieden	(Russia) Elena Kapustina, Party, Parson Russell Terrier, Natalia Sternberg, Lika, Shetland Sheepdog, Darya Ponomareva, Napoleon, German Spitz	(Japan) Chizuko Kuzuya, Jouer, Shetland Sheepdog, Kei Wakana, Hime, Jack Russell Terrier, Maho Yamaguchi, Suzuka Grandprix, Shetland Sheepdog	(Slovenia) Dasa Zakotnik, Katka, Poodle, Brigita Zajec, Ela, Parson Russell Terrier, Urska Krenk, Lu, Poodle
2011	(France) Lievin	(Russia) Elena Kapustina, Party, Parson Russell Terrier, Maria Tomilova, Chika, Shetland Sheepdog, Anastasja Levchenko, Joy, Shetland Sheepdog	(Slovenia) Dasa Zakotnik, Katka, Poodle, Dasa Zakotnik, Bounce, Shetland Sheepdog, Urska Krenk, Lu, Poodle	(Japan) Noriko Morikawa, Mika, Papillon dog, Chikako Yoshida, Momo, Corgi, Maho Yamaguchi, Suzuka Grandprix, Shetland Sheepdog
2012	(Czech Republic) Liberec	(Russia) Tobias Wüst, Peanut, Shetland Sheepdog, Ilona Rinke, Leeroy, Papillon dog, Corinna Hornung, Alice, Shetland Sheepdog, Hinky Nickels, Pitch, Shetland Sheepdog	(Czech Republic) Jitka Klozová, Aninka, Miniature Schnauzer, Monika Šaling, Blackie, Shetland Sheepdog, Martina Konečná, Speedy, Shetland Sheepdog, Martina Konečná, Inch, Shetland Sheepdog	(Denmark) Natasha Gjerulff, Primadonna, Shetland Sheepdog, Susanne Prier, Dweet, Shetland Sheepdog, Natasha Gjerulff, Cider, Shetland Sheepdog, Hanne Svejstrup, Soffy, Shetland Sheepdog
2013	(South Africa) Johannesburg	(Germany) Philipp Mueller-Schnick, Casper, Parson Russell Terrier, Corinna Hornung, Alice, Shetland Sheepdog, Hinky Nickels, Pitch, Shetland Sheepdog, Thomas Ebeling, Gum, Shetland Sheepdog	(Switzerland) Conny Spengler, Baldur, Papillon dog, Nadine Hunsperger, Q, Shetland Sheepdog, Evelyne Hunkeler, Lenny, Jack Russell Terrier, Jeanette Roth, Judi, Papillon dog	(South Africa) Alett Reed, Volt, Shetland Sheepdog, Hilary Jordaan, Euro, Poodle, Gaby Frey, Scoobie, Poodle, Nanette Perold, Mr Noodle, Poodle
2014	(Luxembourg) Kirchberg	(Germany) Corinna Hornung, Alice, Shetland Sheepdog, Paul Hirning, Jet, Shetland Sheepdog, Hinky Nickels, Pitch, Shetland Sheepdog, Christina Bergtholdt, Kiss, Shetland Sheepdog	(Spain) Luis Luque Rodriguez, Melendi, Poodle, Carmen Briceno de la Rosa, Magia, Shetland Sheepdog, Augustin Centelles Rafeles, Mims, Poodle, Ivan Pardo Garcia, Nuca, Tibet Spaniel	(Switzerland) Marco Gander, Julie, Parson Russell Terrier, Evelyne Hunkeler, Lenny, Jack Russell Terrier, Sandro Matter, Dune, Papillon dog, Martin Eberle, Eyleen, Shetland Sheepdog
2015	(Italy) Bologna	(Czech Republic) Adéla Havlíková, Bejka, Miniature Pinscher, Dita Korcová, Pepe, Poodle, Martina Konecná, Inch, Shetland Sheepdog, Olga Edrová, Bodie, Shetland Sheepdog	(Austria) Hans Fried, Chili, Shetland Sheepdog, Bernd Hüppe, Jack, Shetland Sheepdog, Sabrina Hauser, Amber, Shetland Sheepdog, Rene Almberger, Gatsby, Shetland Sheepdog	(Lithuania) Ausra Volosenkinienė, Feti, Poodle, Jurate Miliunaite, Sabi, Border Terrier, Laima Statutaite, Flipsi, Griffon Belge, Vilija Snorkiene, Fai, Shetland Sheepdog
2016	(Spain) Saragozza	(Germany) Bozena Plaßmann, Cap, Shetland Sheepdog, Lisandra Ströhle, Lou, Shetland Sheepdog, Tobias Wüst, Peanut, Shetland Sheepdog, Barbara Lodde, Souki, Parson Russell Terrier	(Estonia) Ede Brand, Chika, Shetland Sheepdog, Marta Miil, Jay, Shetland Sheepdog, Dmitri Kargin, Stenley, Shetland Sheepdog, Jelena Marzaljuk, Tesla, Shetland Sheepdog	(France) Eric Canchy, Dread, Poodle, Caroline Canchy, Gust, Poodle, Alexandre Durindel, Hello, Poodle, Maxime Parraud, Kawaii, Shetland Sheepdog
2017	(Czech Republic) Liberec	(Italy) Alberto Marmo, Dhitta, Parson Russell Terrier, Adriano Pacifico, Po, Shetland Sheepdog, Luciano Ganz, Eva, Parson Russell Terrier, Andrea Tagliapietra, Alan, Poodle	(France) Eric Canchy, Dread, Poodle, Caroline Canchy, Gust, Poodle, Maxime Parraud, Kawaii, Shetland Sheepdog, Sophie Lafond, Felicity, Shetland Sheepdog	(Lithuania) Ausra Volosenkinienė, Feti, Poodle, Jurate Miliunaite, Sabi, Border Terrier, Vilija Snorkiene, Fai, Shetland Sheepdog, Ausra Volosenkinienė, Soya, Poodle
2018	(Norway) Kristianstad	(Estonia) Triine Piirsalu, Roxy, Miniature Pinscher, Marta Miil, Jay, Shetland Sheepdog, Ede Brand, Chika, Shetland Sheepdog, Keida Raamat, My, Shetland Sheepdog	(Slovenia) Roland Kolenko, Mee, Parson Russell Terrier, Roland Kolenko, Ammy, Parson Russell Terrier, Sandi Okanovic, Miya, Shetland Sheepdog, Manca Mikec, Aksi, Papillon dog	(Germany) Tobias Wüst, Dörte, Shetland Sheepdog, Bozena Schröder, Cap, Shetland Sheepdog, Dirk Schlathölter, Boomer, Shetland Sheepdog, Maik Brands, Sissy, Shetland Sheepdog
2019	(Finland) Turku	(Germany) Tobias Wüst, Dörte, Shetland Sheepdog, Lizandra Ströhle, Lou, Shetland Sheepdog, Saskia Laudenberg, Pepper, Shetland Sheepdog, Jule Ullrich, Lee, Shetland Sheepdog	(Russia) Ekaterina Sapriko, Rika, German Spitz, Maria Metelkova, Figaro, Poodle, Anna Ivanova, Flip, Shetland Sheepdog, Marina Zavoloka, Rio, German Spitz	(Czech Republic) Markéta Zavadilová, Ria, Shetland Sheepdog, Denisa Lajmarova, Rally, Parson Russell Terrier, Lucie Krauskopfova, Kessy, Parson Russell Terrier, Eva Lacnakova, Chiqi, Shetland Sheepdog
2022	(Austria) Schwechat	(Hungary) Dalma Naggyőr, Welle, Shetland Sheepdog, Brigitta Ray, Blue, Papillon dog, Krisztina Wéber, Nils, Parson Russell Terrier, Réka Novák, Blue, Shetland Sheepdog	(Finland) Assi Rapeli, Ninni, Shetland Sheepdog, Sanni Kariniemi, Megs, Shetland Sheepdog, Maria Sori, Malla, Shetland Sheepdog, Iida Vakkuri, Helka, Shetland Sheepdog	(Spain) Carmen Briceno de la Rosa, Isla, Shetland Sheepdog, Pau Serrano Ciratusa, Norte, Shetland Sheepdog, César Martínez Bouzón, My Boo, Shetland Sheepdog, David Ferrer Jimenez, Ammy, Parson Russell Terrier
2023	(Czech Republic) Liberec	(Germany) Tobias Wüst, Dörte, Shetland Sheepdog, Silas Boogk, Gadget, Shetland Sheepdog, Max Sprinz, Make, Shetland Sheepdog, Stefanie Simson, Bibi, Shetland Sheepdog	(Belgium) Veronique Leers, Moose, Shetland Sheepdog, Aline Tricot, Ozone, Shetland Sheepdog, Sharon Debruyne, Dino, Shetland Sheepdog, Andrea Prezzi, Zoemm, Shetland Sheepdog	(Hungary) Dalma Naggyőr, Welle, Shetland Sheepdog, Réka Novák, Blue, Shetland Sheepdog, Cintia Favari, Jum, Shetland Sheepdog, Péter Kuti, Nico, Shetland Sheepdog
2024	(Belgium) Opglabbeek	(Germany) Silas Boogk, Gadget, Shetland Sheepdog, Daniel Schröder, Via, Shetland Sheepdog, Max Sprinz, Make, Shetland Sheepdog, Maurice Münch, Swoosh, Shetland Sheepdog	(Hungary) Dalma Naggyőr, Welle, Shetland Sheepdog, Brigitta Szabo-Ray, Sinistra, Papillon dog, Katalin Farkas, Amy, Poodle, Péter Kuti, Nico, Shetland Sheepdog	(Belgium) Stephan de Zwart, Tibby, Shetland Sheepdog, Veronique Leers, Moose, Shetland Sheepdog, Andrea Prezzi, Zoemm, Shetland Sheepdog, Martine Van den Bossche, Kila, Shetland Sheepdog
2025	(Sweden) Kalmar	(Germany) Silas Boogk, Gadget, Shetland Sheepdog, Tobias Wüst, Heidi, Shetland Sheepdog, Max Sprinz, Make, Shetland Sheepdog, Oleksandra Ivashchenko, Shanty, Shetland Sheepdog	(Slovakia) Anna Pospíšilová, Ruby, Shetland Sheepdog, Anna Pospíšilová, Mave, Papillon dog, Simona Filová, Kelly, Parson Russell Terrier, Adrián Botka, Nymeria, Poodle	(Switzerland) Simon Tabourat, Lewis, Shetland Sheepdog, Sandra Inglin, Piip, Shetland Sheepdog, Claudia Schwab, Ellie, Shetland Sheepdog, Sascha Vadagnin, Haylie, Shetland Sheepdog

=== Team Medium ===
Year	Location	Gold	Silver	Bronze
2002	(Germany) Dortmund	(Luxembourg) Fabienne Thines, Rico, Shetland Sheepdog, Fernand Eiffes, Q'Ori, Icelandic Sheepdog, Patrick Krier, Angie, Nova Scotia Duck Tolling Retriever	(Belgium) Jean-Pierre Verbesselt, Kitana, Shetland Sheepdog, Ides Van Heghe, Prince, Shetland Sheepdog, Petrone Hoebeeck, Quirio, Shetland Sheepdog	(Netherlands) Jacqueline Lefevre, Nimbus, Shetland Sheepdog, Francoise Milleville, Noël, Pyrenean Sheepdog, Sylvain Jacquemin, Mira des Drayeres, Pyrenean Sheepdog
2003	(France) Lievin	(Austria) Sabrina Hauser, Buster, Shetland Sheepdog, Hans Fried, Timmy, Shetland Sheepdog, Sabrina Hauser, Gismo, Shetland Sheepdog	(Spain) Peregrina Saavedra Garcia, Spanish Styles Blue Baby, Shetland Sheepdog, Mariano Bo Celdran, Hueso, Cocker Spaniel, Mario Rodriguez Matesanz, Tor, Schnauzer	(Russia) Olga Efremenkova, Exclusive, Welsh Terrier, Lyubov Zvorygina, Korn Koled, Shetland Sheepdog, Anna Polejaeva, Zolotoy lis, Shetland Sheepdog
2004	(Italy) Montichiari	(Norway) Morten Bratlie, Iver, Shetland Sheepdog, Kjellaug Riis, Oscar, Shetland Sheepdog, Ingrid Frøysa, Tullik, Shetland Sheepdog	(Austria) Sabrina Hauser, Buster, Shetland Sheepdog, Hans Fried, Timmy, Shetland Sheepdog, Sabrina Hauser, Gismo, Shetland Sheepdog	(Belgium) Sarah Ashmead, Clio, Poodle, Priscilla Barrett, Jem, Border Terrier, Jeannette Tandy, Buddy, Border Terrier
2005	(Spain) Valladolid	(Finland) Petteri Huotari, Last Mohican, Border Terrier, Ulla Nikkilä, Zirocco, Shetland Sheepdog, Asa Rancken, Mymlan, Kromfohrländer	(Japan) Sachiko Naito, Bess, Cocker Spaniel, Shota Tsukahara, Anni, Shetland Sheepdog, Mami Horaguchi, Austar, Shetland Sheepdog	(Spain) Mario Rodriguez Matesanz, Tor, Schnauzer, Peregrina Saavedra Garcia, Spanish Styles Blue Baby, Shetland Sheepdog, Remigio Beltran, Marine-Breeze, Shetland Sheepdog
2006	(Switzerland) Basil	(Finland) Jari Suomalainen, Frodo Bromus, Kooikerhondje, Nina Manner, Taavi, Welsh Terrier, Mari Virkkula, Xosmo, Puli dog	(Czech Republic) Olga Edrová, Adder Black, Shetland Sheepdog, Martina Podestová, Gwendolyn, Shetland Sheepdog, Radovan Liska, Enya, Shetland Sheepdog	(Norway) Bodil Lund Nilsson, Tiril, Shetland Sheepdog, Morten Bratlie, Iver, Shetland Sheepdog, Christina Kosinski, Prince, Shetland Sheepdog
2007	(Norway) Hamar	(Russia) Svetlana Tumanova, Printz, Shetland Sheepdog, Daria Popova, Valter, Shetland Sheepdog, Yulia Maksimova, Endi, Shetland Sheepdog	(United Kingdom) Bernadette Bay, Zen, Shetland Sheepdog, Alan Gardner, Jude, Border Collie, Amanda Hampson, Minx, Nova Scotia Duck Tolling Retriever	(Brazil) Samy Wroblewski, Dana, Border Collie, Alexander Schcolnik, Tyller, Shetland Sheepdog, Aurélio Schubert, Cacau, Shetland Sheepdog
2008	(Finland) Helsinki	(France) Pauline Jenn, A Little Star, Shetland Sheepdog, Emmanuel Melain, Aqua, Australian Kelpie, Patrick Servais, Thor, Shetland Sheepdog	(Switzerland) Claudia Tschuor, Cuba-Libre, Pyrenean Sheepdog, Melanie Stetter, Januja, Schapendoes, Anton Zürcher, Witch, Border Collie	(Czech Republic) Eva Sulcová, Jimy, Manchester Terrier, Olga Edrová, Edy, Shetland Sheepdog, Radovan Liska, Edy, Shetland Sheepdog
2009	(Austria) Dornbirn	(Finland) Lida Koskelainen, Soolo, Shetland Sheepdog, Jari Laitinen, Robi, Kooikerhondje, Anu Niemi, Viima, Kromfohrländer	(United States) Karen Holik, Sizzle, Shetland Sheepdog, Ashley Deacon, Luka De La Brise, Pyrenean Sheepdog, Jennifer Crank, Blaster, Shetland Sheepdog	(Slovenia) Sylvia Trkman, Simply the Best, Pyrenean Sheepdog, Anabella Kokali, Shana, Pyrenean Sheepdog, Zoltan Pap, Pilko, Poodle
2010	(Germany) Rieden	(Belgium) Johan Vos, Birko, Shetland Sheepdog, Petrone Hoebeck, Erszie, Mudi, Veronique Leers, Eoran, Shetland Sheepdog	(Finland) Jari Suomalainen, Frodo Bromus, Kooikerhondje, Sini Eriksson, Sonic, Shetland Sheepdog, Sami Oksa, Luka, Kooikerhondje	(France) Pauline Jenn, A Little Star, Shetland Sheepdog, Emmanuel Melain, Aqua, Australian Kelpie, Thomas Raczka, Curly, Pyrenean Sheepdog
2011	(France) Lievin	(France) Pauline Jenn, A Little Star, Shetland Sheepdog, Emmanuel Melain, Aqua, Australian Kelpie, Thomas Raczka, Curly, Pyrenean Sheepdog	(Switzerland) Markus Geiger, Indigo, Shetland Sheepdog, Simone De Brot, Jamie, Shetland Sheepdog, Melanie Stetter, Januja, Schapendoes	(United Kingdom) Natasha Wise, Heck, Border Collie, Amanda Hampson, Jade, Nova Scotia Duck Tolling Retriever, Angela Williams, Ten, Border Collie
2012	(Czech Republic) Liberec	(Czech Republic) Martina Magnoli Klimešová, Kiki, Mudi, Petra Hamšíková, Lara, Shetland Sheepdog, Kateřina Malačková, Jackie, Pyrenean Sheepdog, Nikola Schovancová, Kejsi, Pyrenean Sheepdog	(Spain) David Molina Gimeno, Fran, Spanish Water Dog, Mario Rodriguez Matesanz, Wirbel, Schnauzer, Ariadna Soriano Diaz, Del Zarzoso Gotika, Fox Terrier, Albert Ulldemolins Santisteve, Seviwelsh Webcam, Welsh Terrier	(Hungary) Veronika Herendy, Zenit, Shetland Sheepdog, Zsuzsa Veres, Eta, Croatian Sheepdog, Árpád Pirity, Bruni, Shetland Sheepdog, Ágnes Ács-Kövesi, Eppie, Poodle
2013	(South Africa) Johannesburg	(Switzerland) Tina Minuz, Peewee, Schapendoes, Gaby Hess, Shayn, Shetland Sheepdog, Ralf Bänsch, Jay, Shetland Sheepdog, Brigitt Braun, Roxy, Manchester Terrier	(Germany) Annette Illmer, Sky, Shetland Sheepdog, Johanna Müller, Piet, Beagle, Birgit Hackober, Yara, Poodle, Annett Fiebig, Jim Knopf, Pyrenean Sheepdog	(South Africa) Christelle Scheepers, Razu, Shetland Sheepdog, Annaret Meintjes, Bowie, Kooikerhondje, Kelly Taylor, Lucy, Schnauzer, Gaby Grohovaz, Lollie, Pyrenean Sheepdog
2014	(Luxembourg) Kirchberg	(United States) Maureen Waldron, Michael, Shetland Sheepdog, John Nys, Rush, Shetland Sheepdog, Kathleen Oswald, Whimzy, Shetland Sheepdog, Geri Hernandez, Switch, Poodle	(France) Emmanuel Melain, Aqua, Australian Kelpie, Thomas Raczka, Curly, Pyrenean Sheepdog, Séverine Gautier, Dawa, Shetland Sheepdog, Renaud Castelain, Demeter, Shetland Sheepdog	(Brazil) Samy Wroblewski, Theo, Shetland Sheepdog, Vivyane Specian, Jem, Shetland Sheepdog, Marcela Checchia, Dora, Border Collie, Katia Silva, Carol, Shetland Sheepdog
2015	(Italy) Bologna	(Czech Republic) Martina Magnoli Klimešová, Kiki, Mudi, Petra Hamšíková, Lara, Shetland Sheepdog, Kateřina Malačková, Jackie, Pyrenean Sheepdog, Barbara Sajdokova, Safi, Mudi	(Switzerland) Claudia Schwab, Mylo, Shetland Sheepdog, Manuela Schlup, Siim, Shetland Sheepdog, Letizia Grunder, Nomade, Mudi, Martin Eberle, Kayo, Shetland Sheepdog	(Slovenia) Silvia Trkman, Le, Pyrenean Sheepdog, Katarina Podlipnik, Minu, Pumi dog, Blaz Oven, Ink, Shetland Sheepdog, Tina Solar, Vip, Pumi dog
2016	(Spain) Saragozza	(Germany) Yvonne Bormann, Casper, Shetland Sheepdog, Nicole Kelpen, Kite, Shetland Sheepdog, Stephanie Schlühr, Lif, Shetland Sheepdog, Daniel Schröder, Nick, Shetland Sheepdog	(Sweden) Åsa Emanuelsson, Alma, Spanish Water Dog, Patrik Rosendal, Aya, Shetland Sheepdog, Malin Tangfelt, Hippi, Poodle, Eva Persson, Visa, Shetland Sheepdog	(Belgium) Andy De Groote, Deedee, Border Collie, Els van Hauwermeiern, Jazz, Shetland Sheepdog, Rebekka De Backer, Revi, Shetland Sheepdog, Tamara Cuypers, Yanu, Pyrenean Sheepdog
2017	(Czech Republic) Liberec	(Slovenia) Silvia Trkman, Le, Pyrenean Sheepdog, Blaz Oven, Ink, Shetland Sheepdog, Anabella Kokalj, Viva, Shetland Sheepdog, Ugrin Babunski, Zin, Pumi dog	(Czech Republic) Kateřina Malačková, Jackie, Pyrenean Sheepdog, Martina Magnoli Klimešová, Kiki, Mudi, Eliška Panáčová, Jive, Shetland Sheepdog, Radka Mokrišová, Easy, Shetland Sheepdog	(France) Renaud Castelain, Demeter, Shetland Sheepdog, Maelle Desmery/Callec, Iummy, Shetland Sheepdog, Benjamin Maitre, Nakhal, Poodle, Alexandre Caclin, Link, Shetland Sheepdog
2018	(Norway) Kristianstad	(France) Virginie Bruna, Ice Tea, Shetland Sheepdog, Alexandre Caclin, Link, Shetland Sheepdog, Renaud Castelain, Demeter, Shetland Sheepdog, Maelle Desmery/Callec, Iummy, Shetland Sheepdog	(Czech Republic) Martina Magnoli Klimešová, Kiki, Mudi, Radka Mokrišová, Easy, Shetland Sheepdog, Eliska Kaletova, Juve, Shetland Sheepdog, Eva Maderova, Flame, Shetland Sheepdog	(Germany) Daniel Schröder, Cashew, Shetland Sheepdog, Bozena Schröder, Puck, Shetland Sheepdog, Silas Boogk, Beam, Shetland Sheepdog, Joachim Graf, Zeus, Manchester Terrier
2019	(Finland) Turku	(Germany) Silas Boogk, Beam, Shetland Sheepdog, Bozena Schröder, Puck, Shetland Sheepdog, Stephanie Schlühr, Lif, Shetland Sheepdog, Karin Hellriegel, Gimmick, Mudi	(Czech Republic) Aneta Obrusnikova, Ollie, Mudi, Martina Magnoli Klimešová, Kiki, Mudi, Kateřina Malačková, Izzy, Pyrenean Sheepdog, Jitka Hrdinova, Nany, Pyrenean Sheepdog	(France) Benjamin Maitre, Nakhal, Poodle, Maelle Desmery/Callec, Iummy, Shetland Sheepdog, Mickael Renaud, TA, Mudi, Cedric Bargoin, Idwall, Shetland Sheepdog
2022	(Austria) Schwechat	(Germany) Daniel Schröder, Cashew, Shetland Sheepdog, Silas Boogk, Beam, Shetland Sheepdog, Johann Weberling, Momo, Australian Shepherd, Krisztina Beitl-Kabai, Hydro, Shetland Sheepdog	(Hungary) Evelin Szakál, Sasha, Poodle, Gergely Maros, Dance, Shetland Sheepdog, Petra Meszaros, Kiito, Poodle, Zsombor László, Ark, Shetland Sheepdog	(Austria) Laura Reinhalter, Zookie, Shetland Sheepdog, Tamara Sedlmaier, You, Shetland Sheepdog, Nadine Kohl, Zola, Australian Shepherd, Sabrina Hauser, Layla, Shetland Sheepdog
2023	(Czech Republic) Liberec	(United Kingdom) Lily Dakin, Scout, Shetland Sheepdog, Steven Richardson, Willow, Shetland Sheepdog, Stephanie Best, Skedaddle, Shetland Sheepdog, James Adams, Willow, Cocker Spaniel	(Belgium) Marc van Beeck, Peejay, Mudi, Andrea Prezzi, Finn, Shetland Sheepdog, Taina Verbesselt, Sep, Shetland Sheepdog, Jacobs Veerle, Sid, Shetland Sheepdog	(Luxembourg) Gilles Welfringer, G-Force, Shetland Sheepdog, Julie Celmar, Ink, Mudi, Natascha Seuré, New, Shetland Sheepdog, Natascha Schmitz, Dylan, Shetland Sheepdog
2024	(Belgium) Opglabbeek	(Czech Republic) Aneta Obrusnikova, Ollie, Mudi, Aneta Obrusnikova, Chilli, Mudi, Aneta Obrusnikova, Arrya, Mudi, Lenka Fuksova, Hippie, Australian Kelpie	(Germany) Silas Boogk, Beam, Shetland Sheepdog, Krisztina Beitl-Kabai, Hydro, Shetland Sheepdog, Eva Müller Schnick, Boom, Shetland Sheepdog, Anne Lenz, Rosalie, Cocker Spaniel	(France) Jessica Flouret, Kira, Australian Kelpie, Priscilia Ador, Shetland Sheepdog, Maui, Renaud Castelain, Lips, Miniature American Shepherd, Morgane Broudin, Moutik, Poodle
2025	(Sweden) Kalmar	(Spain) Nina Causevic, Suri, Cocker Spaniel, Pau Serrano Ciratusa, Killer, Shetland Sheepdog, Pilar Collado Hernandez, Bubal, Spanish Water Dog, Jesus Fernandez Crispo, Baileys, Cocker Spaniel	(Germany) Jasmin Wettläufer, Lennox, Shetland Sheepdog, Tobias Wüst, Mercedes, Shetland Sheepdog, Eva Müller Schnick, Boom, Shetland Sheepdog, Anne Lenz, Rosalie, Cocker Spaniel	(Italy) Martina Magnoli Klimesova, Malinka, Mudi, Giacomo Blessent, Like, Shetland Sheepdog, Andrea Buongarzoni, Brigitte, Croatian Sheepdog, Viennalisa di Tullio, Witch, Parson Russell Terrier

=== Team Intermediate ===
Year	Location	Gold	Silver	Bronze
2023	(Czech Republic) Liberec	(Germany) Tobias Wüst, Eve, Border Collie, Ramona Schürken, Lyric, Border Collie, Rebecca Kowalski, Liv, Border Collie, Ariane Wieber, Zola, Border Collie	(Italy) Enrico Collini, Kim, Border Collie, Domenico Giovinetti, Cheebon, Border Collie, Denis Giovanelli, Easy-Peasy, Border Collie, Sanna Simone, Eterna, Border Collie	(United Kingdom) Dalton Meredith, Clippy, Border Collie, Steven Richardson, Gamble, Border Collie, Euan Paterson, Crazee, Border Collie, Nicola Wildman, Zest, Border Collie
2024	(Belgium) Opglabbeek	(Czech Republic) Lucie Růžičková, Brilley, Border Collie, Sára Simandlová, Dakota, Border Collie, Jan Fiala, KnedleeCzech, Border Collie, Dana Mixová, Valerie, Border Collie	(Spain) Adrian Bajo, Dive, Border Collie, Ivan Jose Cubedo Alcazar, Selene, Border Collie, Alejandro Sequeiros Martinez, Buba, Border Collie, Ricardo Jesus Martinez Vargas Machuca, Fiby, Border Collie	(Italy) Stefano Martelli, Petra, Border Collie, Ivana Sipalova, Zozo, Australian Kelpie, Enrico Collini, Bagheera, Border Collie, Denis Giovannelli, Easy-Peasy, Border Collie
2025	(Sweden) Kalmar	(Spain) Michel Menez de Freitas, Jakka, Border Collie, Ivan Jose Cubedo Alcazar, Selene, Border Collie, Pau Serrano Ciratusa, Break, Border Collie, Alejandro Barrios Lianez, Ohana, Spanish Water Dog	(Belgium) Anke Mangelschots, Jill, Border Collie, Marine Tonglet, Umbell, Border Collie, Coralie Lizin, Raya, Border Collie, Michele Pauwels, Nica, Border Collie	(United Kingdom) Lee Gibson, Star, Border Collie, Toni Smith, Febe, Border Collie, Steven Richardson, Gamble, Border Collie, Euan Paterson, Crazee, Border Collie

=== Team Large ===
Year	Location	Gold	Silver	Bronze
1996	(Switzerland) Morges	(France) Didier Guimard, Jet, Tervueren, Karine Buoli, Hurane, Tervueren, Isabelle Fasquelle, Gaia, Malinois dog, Laurent Canton, Bandy, Border Collie	(Italy) Chiara De Martini, Spot, Border Collie, Arnaldo Benini, Max, Border Collie, Massimo Perla, Shonic, Border Collie, Vittorio Papavero, Shiba, Dobermann Pinscher	(Spain) J. Rodriguez Martinez, Ex, German Shepherd, Jose R. Pena Rodriguez, Copo, Boxer dog, J. Vinuesa Gonzalez, Trui, Majorca Shepherd Dog, E. M. Curras Del Rio, Xenia, German Shepherd
1997	(Denmark) Copenhagen	(Switzerland) Marco Mouwen, Maid, Border Collie, Irène Rub, Flash, Border Collie, Jean-Pierre Simond, Django, Border Collie, Cadio Perecin, Faisa, Laekenois	(Netherlands) Henri Van Steenis, Mighty, Border Collie, Anne Mieke Wijshake, Layla, Border Collie, Caty Both, Gandor, Tervueren, Sjaak Nagelkerke, King, Groenendael	(Denmark) Regin Reinhard, Röde, Border Collie, Henning Hessner, Gina, Tervueren, Bibi Hindsgaul, Indy, Border Collie, Henrik Dejgaard, Sheppo, Tervueren
1998	(Slovenia) Maribor	(France) Reynald Muller, Holymph, Siberian Husky, Karine Buoli, Hurane, Tervueren, Gérard Mousse, Jordan, Beauceron, Isabelle Fasquelle, Gaia, Malinois dog	(Denmark) Regin Reinhard, Röde, Border Collie, Gitte Hansen, Sasha, Tervueren, Bibi Hindsgaul, Indy, Border Collie, Susanne Prier Hansen, Mike, Border Collie	(Germany) Ernst Laurence, Twist, Border Collie, Brigitte Augustiny, Melodie, Tervueren, Claudia Elsner, Victor, Border Collie, Kirsten Prischmann, Nessy, Groenendael
1999	(Germany) Dortmund	(Germany) Sylvia Vaanholt, Nico, Border Coliie, Christiane Klar, Ole, Malinois dog, Claudia Elsner, Victor, Border Collie, Thomas Behrendt, Gismo, Border Collie	(France) Reynald Muller, Holymph, Siberian Husky, Karine Buoli, Hurane, Tervueren, Gérard Mousse, Jordan, Beauceron, Isabelle Deconninck, Joy, Malinois dog	(Sweden) Peter Rodin, Bimbo, Border Collie, Jörgen Tellqvist, Ricky, Border Collie, Hanna Magnussoon, Heidi, Border Collie, Johan Eriksson, Casey, Border Collie
2000	(Finland) Helsinki	(France) Karine Buoli, Hurane, Tervueren, Isabelle Deconninck, Joy, Malinois dog, Christine Charpentier, Loch Mac Leod, Border Collie, Patrick Servais, Magic, Border Collie	(Netherlands) Mieke Wijshake, Layla, Border Collie, Bianca Van Gastel, Diestro, Border Collie, Ton Van Der Laar, Rex, Border Collie, Henrie Van Steenis, Mighty, Border Collie	(Belgium) Hilde Ceusters, Aisa, Border Collie, Frank Van Gelder, Rebel, Berger des Pyrénées, Luc Janssen, Skippy, Border Collie, Sally Andrews, Udine Daley, Border Collie
2001	(Portugal) Porto	(United States) Steve Frick, Bailey’s , Border Collie, Linda Kipp, Jess, Border Collie, Linda Mecklenburg, Awesome, Border Collie, Elica Calhoun, Suni, Australian Shepherd	(Austria) Andrea Waldhör, Unique, Border Collie, Sonja Mladek, Jason of Jennifer's Bonefire, Border Collie, Sabrina Rössler, Attack du Tisserand, Malinois dog, Ute Schnider, Femme Jaute, Malinois dog	(Spain) Nicolas Garrido, Douglas Beagle, Border Collie, Jose Linares Garcia, Usa del Almudi, Tervueren, Cesar Losada, Tara, Tervueren, Gregori Conde, Rex, Border Collie
2002	(Germany) Dortmund	(Brazil) Flavio Tamaio, Audi Kanove, Border Collie, Eugenio David, Minet Fidel, Border Collie, Laila Samir Abu, Alan Kanove, Border Collie	(Slovenia) Peter Zupancic, Tissa Sigma, Groenendael, Tjasa Gregoric, Dolly Polluxova, Malinois dog, Andreja Jakopic, Antej, Border Collie	(France) Christine Charpentier, Loch Mac Leod, Border Collie, Patrick Servais, Magic, Border Collie, Olivier Adyns, Onyx Red, Border Collie
2003	(France) Lievin	(United Kingdom) Jo Rhodes, Kelbie, Border Collie, Nicola Garrett, Spec, Border Collie, Toni Lock, Whiz, Border Collie	(Belgium) Hilde Ceusters, Aisa, Border Collie, Sally Andrews, Udine Daley, Border Collie, Jan Ruysschaert, Xemilia, Border Collie	(United States) Terry Smorch, Remy, Border Collie, Jen Pinder, Static, Border Collie, Elicia Calhoun, Suni, Australian Shepherd
2004	(Italy) Montichiari	(South Africa) Justus Trutter, Sacha, Border Collie, Noelene Pretorius, Ross, Border Collie, Richard Wright, Chi, Border Collie	(Russia) Anatoly Laryushin, Aiskneht Happy Honor, Border Collie, Elena Kochetova, Aster, Border Collie, Julia Kudinova, Winni, Border Collie	(Italy) Ezio Bertuletti, Penelope Cruz, Border Collie, Gianni Orlandi, Luna, Border Collie, Simona Buffoli, Indi, Border Collie
2005	(Spain) Valladolid	(South Africa) Noelene Pretorius, Ross, Border Collie, Richard Wright, Chi, Border Collie, Noelene Pretorius, Brodie, Border Collie	(Italy) Ezio Bertuletti, Penelope Cruz, Border Collie, Gianni Orlandi, Luna, Border Collie, Davide Melegari, Nike, Border Collie	(Russia) Anatoly Laryushin, Aiskneht Happy Honor, Border Collie, Maria Koblikova, Ambassador, Border Collie, Svetlana Tumanova, Bacon, Border Collie
2006	(Switzerland) Basil	(Croatia) Alen Marekovic, Cap, Border Collie, Domagoj Vidovic, Hita, Tervueren, Tanja Janes, Miska Certisa, Croatian Sheepdog	(Spain) Antonio Molina Aragones, Angie, Border Collie, Jonathan Guillem Rodriguez, Nala, Border Collie, Jordi Grau, Elba, Tervueren	(Sweden) Asa Emanuelsson, Kayla Ia, Border Collie, Maria Jansson, Ginza, Border Collie, Jenny Damm, Elvis, Border Collie
2007	(Norway) Hamar	(Denmark) Lone Sommer, Panik, Border Collie, Soren Gras, Zimba, Border Collie, Sarah Lorentzen, Simic, Border Collie	(United States) Carrie Jones, Jive, Border Collie, Ann Braue, Spree, Border Collie, Linda Mecklenburg, Stellar, Border Collie	(United Kingdom) Lee Windeatt, Shy, Border Collie, Toni Dawkins, Kite, Border Collie, Greg Derrett, GT, Border Collie
2008	(Finland) Helsinki	(Brazil) Laila Samir Abu, Dino Brown, Border Collie, Bruno Moreno da Luz, Gaya, Border Collie, Jose Luiz Filho, Dino, Border Collie	(Netherlands) Roy Fonteijn, Flinn, Border Collie, Martjin Servaas, Kate, Border Collie, Walter Sontrop, Dice, Border Collie	(Belgium) Annick Diels, Yoni, Malinois dog, Theo Uten, Angie, Border Collie, Sally Andrews Banjo Boy, Border Collie
2009	(Austria) Dornbirn	(Russia) Elena Taktaeva, Nessi, Border Collie, Anatoly Laryushin, Den, Border Collie, Svetlana Tumanova, Bacon Beksa, Border Collie	(Italy) Claudio Frigerio, Cous Cous, Border Collie, Emanuele Toncelli, Shake, Border Collie, Irene Unkauf, Omelette, Border Collie	(United Kingdom) Lee Windeatt, Bold, Border Collie, Sue Rolfe, Kessy, Border Collie, Jackie Gardner, Tom, Border Collie
2010	(Germany) Rieden	(Sweden) Åsa Gunnarsson, Cadi, Border Collie, Jenny Damm, Ina, Border Collie, Malin Elfström, Swift, Border Collie	(Spain) Jonathan Guillem Rodriguez, Chus, Border Collie, Antonio Molina Aragones, Angie, Border Collie, Oscar Muniz Martinez, Boss, Border Collie	(Russia) Elena Taktaeva, Nessi, Border Collie, Anatoly Laryushin, Den, Border Collie, Elena Shishakina, Ebby, Border Collie
2011	(France) Lievin	(Spain) Jonathan Guillem Rodriguez, Chus, Border Collie, Oscar Muniz Martinez, Boss, Border Collie, Jenny Funcke, Emmabourne, Groenendael	(Italy) Ezio Bertuletti, Penelope Cruz, Border Collie, Irene Unkauf, Bonita, Border Collie, Paolo Ciaghi, Fatal, Border Collie	(Czech Republic) Radovan Liska, Amulet, Border Collie, Martina Vaskebová, Cindy, Border Collie, Tereza Králová, Nice, Border Collie
2012	(Czech Republic) Liberec	(Switzerland) André Mühlebach, Air, Border Collie, Anita Leonardi, Bliss, Border Collie, Christian Fryand, Burbon, Border Collie, Stephanie Hundt, May, Border Collie	(Germany) Philipp Müller Schnick, Heat, Border Collie, Ralf Bauer, Brix, Border Collie, Tobias Wüst, Don, Malinois dog, Lena-Marie Prohl, Zac, Border Collie	(Italy) Fabio Zannoni, Pinkstar, Border Collie, Luca Cortese, Maggie, Border Collie, Irene Unkauf, Bonita, Border Collie, Dennis Beoni, Brie, Border Collie
2013	(South Africa) Johannesburg	(Switzerland) Christian Fryand, Burbon, Border Collie, Andreas Schenker, Eysha, Border Collie, Simon Brenca, Ayla, Australian Shepherd, Jeannine Gloor, U2, Border Collie	(South Africa) Annaret Meintjes, Chinzi, Border Collie, Richard Wright, Kwik, Border Collie, Julie Yates, Chace, Border Collie, Heather Potter, Khyba, Border Collie	(Austria) Josef Bauer, Ace, Border Collie, Christina Brunner, Clown, Border Collie, Alexandra Putz, Sly, Border Collie, Helmut Paulik, Lane, Border Collie
2014	(Luxembourg) Kirchberg	(France) Grégory Bielle Bidalot, Cayenne, Border Collie, Jeremy Chomienne, Elium, Border Collie, Reynald Muller, Fifa, Border Collie, Adrien Grespier, Gumball, Border Collie	(United Kingdom) Charlotte Harding, Scandal, Border Collie, Greg Derrett, Detox, Border Collie, Anthony Clarke, Ruby, Border Collie, Jessica Clarehugh, Cara, Border Collie	(Switzerland) Philippe Cottet, Hype, Border Collie, Tina Vieli, Bean, Border Collie, Martin Eberle, French, Border Collie, André Mühlebach, Air, Border Collie
2015	(Italy) Bologna	(United Kingdom) Matt Goodliffe, Quincy, Border Collie, Greg Derrett, Rehab, Border Collie, Jessica Clarehugh, Cara, Border Collie, Charlotte Harding, Scandal, Border Collie	(Slovenia) Matej Cucek, Jazz, Border Collie, Silvia Trkman, Bu, Border Collie, Marusa Podjed, Kaili, Border Collie, Polona Bonac, Lin, Border Collie	(France) Grégory Bielle Bidalot, Cayenne, Border Collie, Reynald Muller, Fifa, Border Collie, Adrien Grespier, Gumball, Border Collie, Christelle Bouillot, Hyankee, Border Collie
2016	(Spain) Saragozza	(Russia) Daria Smirnova, Agent, Border Collie, Lyubov Zvorygina, Brilliant, Border Collie, Anastasiia Egorova, Chase, Border Collie, Stanislav Kurochkin, Ike, Border Collie	(Finland) Jaakko Suoknuuti, Dao, Border Collie, Janita Leinonen, Fu, Border Collie, Tuulia Liuhto, Pirtu, Border Collie, Santtu Stenberg, Rai Rai, Border Collie	(Germany) Anne Lenz, Chi, Border Collie, Daniel Schröder, Gin, Border Collie, Tobias Wüst, Gucci, Malinois dog, Sandra Wilhelms, Maddox, Border Collie
2017	(Czech Republic) Liberec	(Poland) Magdalena Łabieniec, Issi, Border Collie, Magdalena Ziółkowska, Mawr, Border Collie, Olga Kwiecień, Brego, Pyrenean Shepherd, Natalia Lichecka, Yen, Border Collie	(Germany) Anne Lenz, Chi, Border Collie, Daniel Schröder, Gin, Border Collie, Philipp Müller Schnick, Hunter, Border Collie, Krisztina Beitl-Kabai, Tiu, Border Collie	(Estonia) Marje Piiroja, Süsi, Malinois dog, Marje Piiroja, Malinois dog, Natalia Garastsenko, Bolt, Border Collie, Stefi Praakli, Ettie, Border Collie
2018	(Norway) Kristianstad	(Belgium) Marc van Beeck, Gem, Border Collie, Olivier Maunaert, Keen, Border Collie, Sally Andrews, Orval, Border Collie, Loic Cusumano, Molly, Border Collie	(Russia) Natalia Sternberg, Zhaki, Border Collie, Ekaterina Polivashcheva, Dizi, Border Collie, Anastasia Lobanova, Joker, Border Collie, Stanislav Kurochkin, Zippi, Border Collie	(Finland) Janita Leinonen, Fu, Border Collie, Tuulia Liuhto Pirtu, Border Collie, Niina-Liina Linna, Thor, Border Collie, Kim Kurkinen Zorro, Border Collie
2019	(Finland) Turku	(Spain) Oriol Buch Bautista, Sansa, Border Collie, Iban Cubedo Alcazar, Selene, Border Collie, Oscar Muniz Martinez, Crak, Border Collie, Jonathan Guillem Rodriguez, Tri, Border Collie	(Germany) Mona Grefenstein, Qju, Border Collie, Anne Lenz, Itzi Bitzi, Border Collie, Christiane Fischbach, Jive, Border Collie, Nadine Hartlieb, Anakin, Border Collie	(United Kingdom) Dan Shaw, Geek, Border Collie, Dave Munnings, Fame, Border Collie, Naarah Cuddy, Lemon, Border Collie, Natasha Wise, Pebbles, Border Collie
2022	(Austria) Schwechat	(Greece) Emilia Tziliou, Destiny, Border Collie, Nikiforos Orfanakos, Vito, Border Collie, Christos Balasopoulos, Xcel, Malinois dog, Anna Kouneli, May, Border Collie	(Italy) Veronica Odone, Skill, Border Collie, Martina Magnoli Klimesova, Nemi, Border Collie, Gianluca Schingaro, Ex, Border Collie, Nicola Giraudi, Eira, Border Collie	(Germany) Nadine Alshut, Cinna, Border Collie, Christian Prinz Wake, Border Collie, Tobias Wüst Ceed, Border Collie, Sabine Kreutz, Foo, Border Collie
2023	(Czech Republic) Liberec	(Germany) Mona Grefenstein, Sea, Border Collie, Max Sprinz Style, Border Collie, Sabine Kreutz, Foo, Border Collie, Nadine Alshut, Cinna, Border Collie	(Italy) Martina Magnoli Klimesova, Nemi, Border Collie, Nicola Giraudi, Katniss, Border Collie, Veronica Odone, Skill, Border Collie, Giacomo Biancalani, Music, Border Collie	(Switzerland) Yannick Boutellier, Taff, Border Collie, Alice Laforge, Tesla, Border Collie, Silvan Zumthurm, Zeven, Border Collie, Nathalie Brunner, Faye, Border Collie
2024	(Belgium) Opglabbeek	(Germany) Mona Grefenstein, Sea, Border Collie, Max Sprinz Style, Border Collie, Tobias Wüst Ceed, Border Collie, Anne Lenz, Vis, Border Collie	(United Kingdom) Naarah Cuddy, Lemon, Border Collie, Dave Munnings, Legacy, Border Collie, Martin Reid, Shape, Border Collie, Chris Kerton, Cop, Border Collie	(Netherlands) Nathalie de Korte-Tarant, Brave, Border Collie, Jan Sprij, Reece, Border Collie, Wendy Willemse, Draig, Border Collie, Patrick Bouwmans, Daemon, Border Collie
2025	(Sweden) Kalmar	(Spain) Jonathan Guillem Rodriguez, City, Border Collie, Iban Cubedo Alcazar, Dash, Border Collie, Adrian Bajo Alonso, Gif, Border Collie, Axular Casado Aguinako, Eywa, Border Collie	(Italy) Nicola Giraudi, Katniss, Border Collie, Valentino Bustreo, Belle, Border Collie, Giovanni Salomoni, Kobe, Border Collie, Giacomo Biancalani, J-Music, Border Collie	(Luxembourg) Daniel Volz, Scooby, Border Collie, Anna Winkel, Turbotoon, Dutch Shepherd Dog, Laura Poos, Tully, Border Collie, Daniel Feyder, Iskren, Border Collie

== Medalists List ==
Total	Player	Individual	Team	Gold	Silver	Bronze
19	(Germany) Tobias Wüst	7	12	11	4	4
13	(Switzerland) Martin Eberle	7	6	2	9	2
13	(Czech Republic) / (Italy) Martina Magnoli Klimešová	5	8	6	5	2
13	(Russia) Svetlana Tumanova	5	8	6	3	4
10	(Germany) Silas Boogk	3	7	6	2	2
10	(Germany) Daniel Schröder	3	7	5	1	4
9	(Slovenia) Silvia Trkman	5	4	4	1	4
8	(Germany) Anne Lenz	2	6	2	5	1
7	(Italy) Nicola Giraudi	4	3	2	4	1
6	(Finland) Janne Karstunen	1	5	1	2	3
6	(Spain) Antonio Molina Aragones	1	5	0	4	2
6	(Czech Republic) Radovan Liška	1	5	0	3	3
5	(United Kingdom) Natasha Wise	3	2	3	0	2
5	(Switzerland) Cornelia Schmid	2	3	2	0	3
5	(France) Thomas Raczka	2	3	1	3	1
5	(Germany) Philipp Müller Schnick	2	3	1	2	2
5	(United Kingdom) Dave Munnings	2	3	0	2	3
5	(Spain) Iban Cubedo Alcazar	1	4	3	1	1
5	(Denmark) Maj-Brit Crone Petersen	1	4	2	3	0
5	(Czech Republic) Kateřina Malačková	1	4	2	3	0
5	(Czech Republic) Olga Edrová	1	4	2	2	1
5	(Belgium) Sally Andrews	1	4	1	1	3
5	(Germany) Max Sprinz	N/A	5	5	0	0
5	(Spain) Jonathan Guillem Rodriguez	N/A	5	3	2	0
4	(Austria) Lisa Frick	4	N/A	4	0	0
4	(Switzerland) Anton Zürcher	3	1	2	2	0
4	(United States) Jennifer Crank	3	1	0	3	1
4	(United Kingdom) Martin Reid	3	1	0	3	1
4	(Slovenia) Roland Kolenko	3	1	0	2	2
4	(France) Christine Charpentier	2	2	3	0	1
4	(Finland) Jari Suomalainen	2	2	2	1	1
4	(Sweden) Jenny Damm	2	2	2	1	1
4	(Germany) Sylvia Vaanholt	2	2	2	0	2
4	(France) Sylvain Jacquemin	2	2	1	2	1
4	(Spain) Peregrina Saavedra Garcia	2	2	1	1	2
4	(Finland) Mika Mättö	2	2	1	1	2
4	(United Kingdom) Naarah Cuddy	2	2	0	2	2
4	(Germany) Hinky Nickels	1	3	3	0	1
4	(Denmark) Tina-Maria Jorgensen	1	3	2	2	0
4	(France) Patrick Servais	1	3	2	1	1
4	(Russia) Varvara Kataeva	1	3	2	1	1
4	(United Kingdom) Greg Derrett	1	3	1	2	1
4	(Italy) Ezio Bertuletti	1	3	0	2	2
4	(France) Karine Buoli	N/A	4	3	1	0
4	(Russia) Natalia Sternberg	N/A	4	2	2	0
4	(France) Emmanuel Melain	N/A	4	2	1	1
4	(France) Reynald Muller	N/A	4	2	1	1
4	(Austria) Sabrina Hauser	N/A	4	1	2	1
4	(France) Renaud Castelain	N/A	4	1	1	2
4	(Russia) Anatoly Laryushin	N/A	4	1	1	2

== See also ==
- Fédération Cynologique Internationale
