= Komondor =

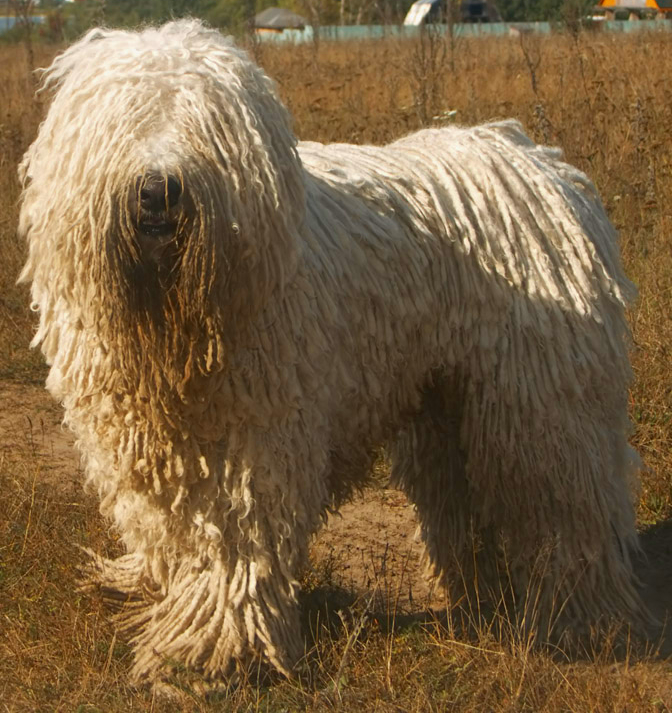
- Komondor
- Other names: Hungarian Commonmop; Hungarian Sheepdog; Mop Dog
- Origin: Hungary
Kennel club standards
- Fédération Cynologique Internationale: standard

The Komondor (/ˈkɒməndɔːr, ˈkoʊm-/), also known as the Hungarian sheepdog, is a large, white-coloured Hungarian breed of livestock guardian dog with a long, corded coat.

Sometimes referred to as 'mop dogs' due to their appearance, the Komondors are a long-established dog breed commonly employed to guard livestock and other property. The Komondor was brought to Europe by the Cumans and the oldest known mention of it is in a Hungarian codex from 1544. The Komondor breed has been declared one of Hungary's national treasures, to be preserved and protected from modification.

== Etymology and history ==
Komondors were brought to Hungary by Cumans, the Turkic speaking, nomadic people who settled in Hungary during the 12th and 13th century. The name Komondor derives from *Koman-dor, meaning "Cuman dog". The breed descends from Tibetan dogs and came from Asia with the Cumans, whose homeland might have been near the Yellow River. In the late 10th century, Mongols began to expand their territories at the expense of the Cumans, forcing them to move westwards. Fleeing from the Mongols, they reached the borders of Hungary in the 12th century. Cumans were granted asylum and settled in Hungary in 1239 under Köten Khan. Komondor remains have been found in Cuman gravesites.

The name "quman-dur" means "belonging to the Cumans" or "the dog of the Cumans", thus distinguishing it from a similar Hungarian sheepdog breed which later merged with the Komondor. The name Komondor is found for the first time written in 1544 in the History of King Astiagis by Péter Kákonyi, in Early Modern Hungarian. Later, in 1673, John Amos Comenius mentions the Komondor in one of his works. Today, the Komondor is a fairly common breed in Hungary, its country of origin. Many Komondors were killed during World War II and local stories say that this was because when the Germans (and then the Russians) invaded, they had to kill the dog before they could capture a farm or house that it guarded.

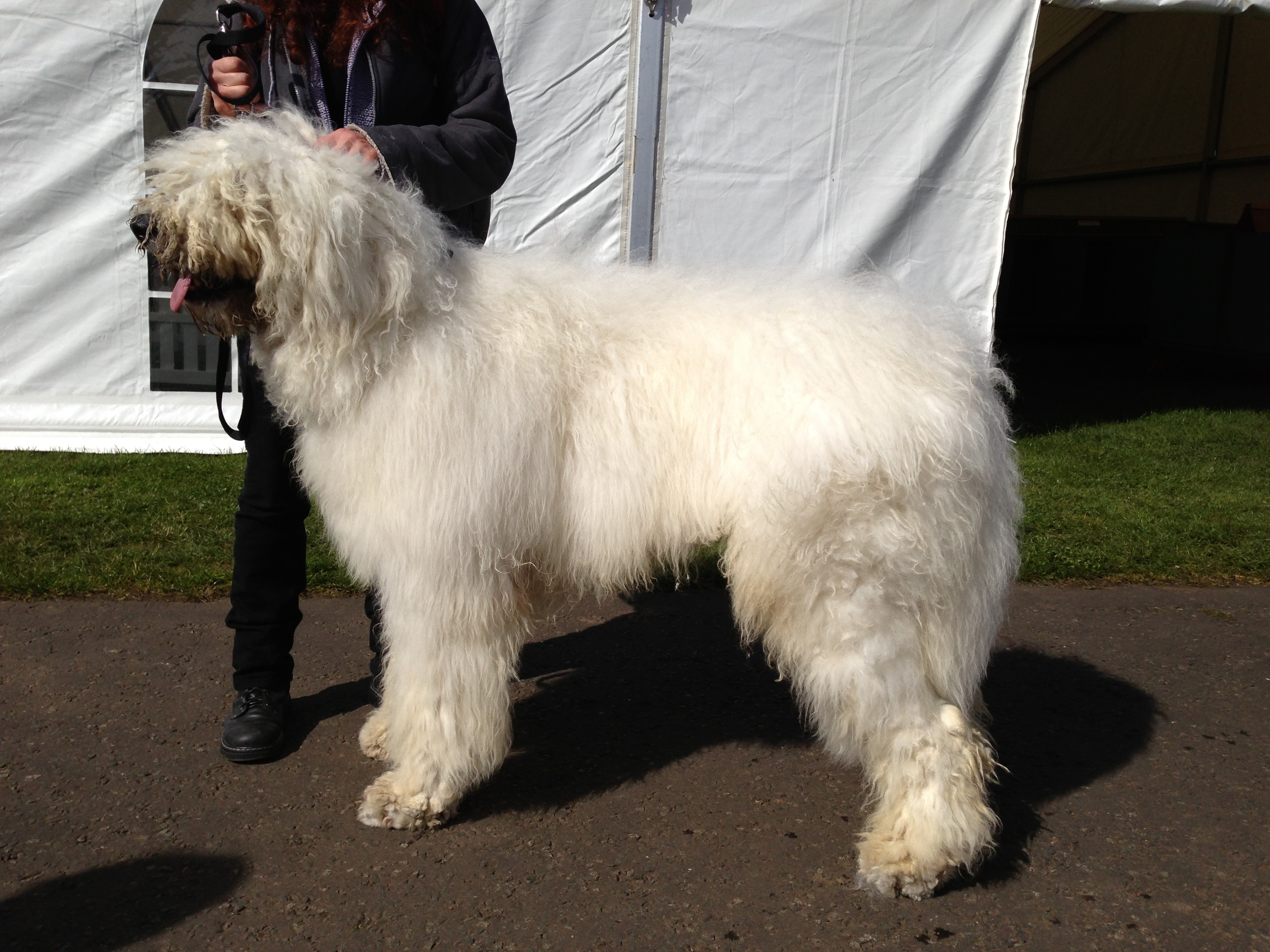
The Komondor is a large dog. Young male Komondor, just over 12 months old, no proper cords developed yet

The Komondor is related to the South Russian Ovcharka, the Puli and, by extension, the Pumi, the Mudi, the Polish Lowland Sheepdog, the Schapendoes, the Bearded Collie, and the Old English Sheepdog. In 1947, the Komondor was used to acquire fresh blood in the rare South Russian Ovcharka. In the 1970s, another Komondor cross was made. It is also believed to be related to the Briard, the Catalonian Sheepdog, the Cão da Serra de Aires, the Pyrenean Shepherd and the Bergamasco shepherd, but the Bergamasco has flocks unlike the Komondor.

The two Hungarian breeds of livestock guardian dogs have evolved independently. This is because the Komondor was developed by a group of people who called it the Kuman-dor, the dog of the Cumans, and the Kuvasz was bred by a different people - the Magyars. For much of Hungary's early history, these two peoples lived in separate areas in Hungary, spoke different languages and so did not mix. As a result, their dogs have little, if any at all, admixture.

== Description ==
The Komondor is a large breed of dog—many are over 30 inches (76 cm) tall. The body is covered with a heavy, matted, corded coat. They have robust bodies, strongly muscled with long legs and a short back. The tail is carried with a slight curl. The body when seen sideways, forms a prone rectangle. The length of body is slightly longer than the height at withers. The Komondor has a broad head with the muzzle slightly shorter than half of the length of the head with an even and complete scissor bite. Nose and lips are always black.

The minimum height of female Komondors is 25.5 inches (65 cm) at the withers, with an average height of 27.5 inches (70 cm). The minimum height of male Komondors is 27.5 inches (70 cm) with an average height of 31.5 inches (80 cm). No upper height limit is given. Komondor females on average weigh between 88–110 lb (40–50 kg) and Komondor males weigh on average between 110–132 lb (50–60 kg).

== Appearance ==
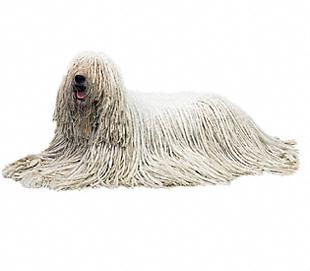
A fully corded coat. The coat is long, thick and strikingly corded

The Komondor's coat is a long, thick, and strikingly corded white coat, about 20–27 cm long (the heaviest amount of fur in the canine world), which resembles dreadlocks or a mop. The puppy coat is soft and fluffy. However, the coat is wavy and tends to curl as the puppy matures. A fully mature coat is formed naturally from the soft undercoat and the coarser outer coat combining to form tassels or cords and will take about two years to form. Some help is needed in separating the cords so the dog does not turn into one large matted mess. The length of the cords increases with time as the coat grows. Moulting is minimal with this breed, contrary to what one might think (once cords are fully formed). The only substantial shedding occurs as a puppy before the dreadlocks fully form. The Komondor is born with only a white coat, unlike the similar-looking Puli, which can be white, black, or sometimes grayish. However, a working Komondor's coat may be discolored by the elements and may appear off-white if not washed regularly. Traditionally, the coat protects the Komondor from possible wolves' bites as the bites would not penetrate the thick coat. The coat of the Komondor takes about two and a half days to dry after a bath.

== Temperament ==
The Komondor is built for livestock guarding. Its temperament is like that of most livestock guarding dogs; it is calm and steady when things are normal, but, in case of trouble, the dog will fearlessly defend its charges. It was bred to think and act independently and make decisions on its own.

The Komondor is affectionate with its family, and gentle with the children and friends of the family. Although wary of strangers, they can accept them when it is clear that no harm is imminent, being instinctively very protective of its family, home, and possessions.

The Komondor is very good with other family pets, often very protective over them, but is intolerant to trespassing animals and is not a good dog for an apartment. The dog is vigilant and will rest in the daytime, keeping an eye on its surroundings, but at night is constantly moving, patrolling the place, moving up and down around its whole territory. The dogs will usually knock down intruders and keep them down until its owner arrives.

Hungarian Komondor breeders used to say that an intruder may be allowed to enter the property guarded by a Komondor, but he will not be allowed to leave or escape.

== Uses ==
The breed has a natural guardian instinct and an inherent ability to guard livestock. An athletic dog, the Komondor is fast and powerful and will leap at a predator to drive it off or knock it down. It can be used successfully to guard sheep against wolves or bears. It is a big, strong dog breed, armored with a thick coat. The coat provides protection against wild animals, weather and vegetation. The coat looks similar to that of a sheep so it can easily blend into a flock and camouflage itself giving it an advantage when predators such as wolves attack. The Komondor is one breed of livestock guardian dog which has seen a vast increase in use as a guardian of sheep and goats in the United States to protect against predators such as coyotes, cougars, bears, and other predators.

== In popular culture ==
The cover of Beck’s 1996 album Odelay is a photo of a Komondor jumping over a hurdle, taken by canine photographer Joan Ludwig (1914–2004) for the July 1977 issue of the American Kennel Club's Gazette.

== See also ==
- Hungarian dog breeds
- List of dog breeds
