= List of Hungarian dog breeds =

This is a list of recognized Hungarian dog breeds.

== Hunting dogs ==
- Vizsla
- Wirehaired Vizsla
- Transylvanian Hound or Erdélyi Kopó, officially 'Hungarian Hound – Transylvanian Scent Hound'
- Magyar Agár or Hungarian Greyhound

== Guard and shepherd dogs ==
- Kuvasz
- Komondor
- Mudi
- Puli
- Pumi

== See also ==
- List of dog breeds
