= Croatian Sheepdog =

Croatian Shepherd Dog
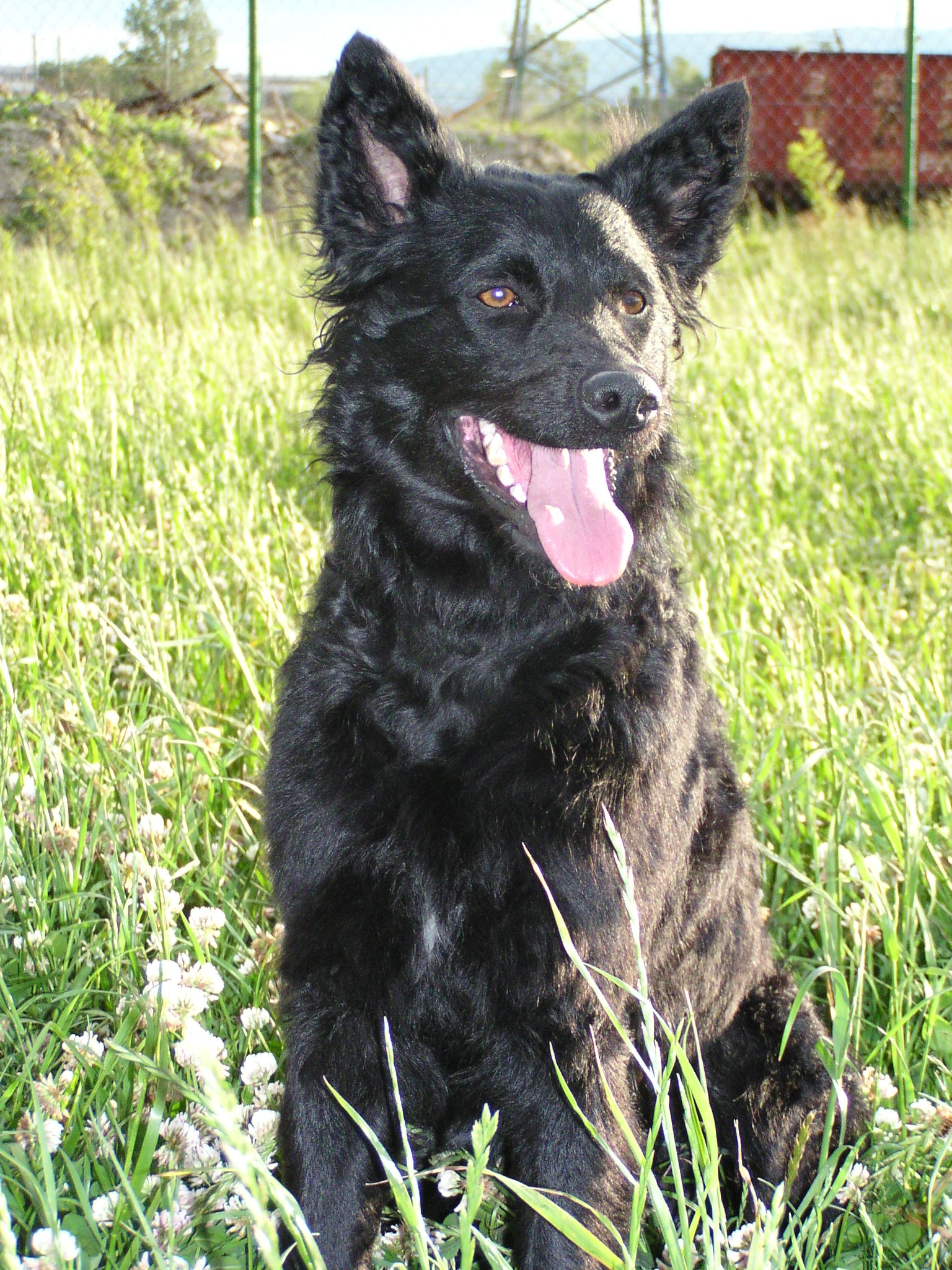
- Other names: Hrvatski Ovčar; Croatian Sheepdog
- Origin: Croatia
- Distribution: country-wide
Traits
Height	Males	45–50 cm
	Females	43–48 cm
- Colour: black
Kennel club standards
- Croatian Kennel Club: standard
- Fédération Cynologique Internationale: standard

The Croatian Shepherd Dog or Hrvatski Ovčar is a Croatian breed of sheepdog of South-European Spitz type. It is one of seven recognised breeds of dog in Croatia, and one of two sheepdogs – the other is the Tornjak. It is closely similar to the Mudi of Hungary – with which its range overlaps – but is slightly larger.

== History ==
The origins of the Croatian Shepherd Dog are unknown. It is a traditional breed of the historic Baranja and Bačka regions of Slavonia, close to the border with Hungary, and may derive from dogs brought to that area from Greece or Turkey, or from elsewhere in the Balkan region. A manuscript from 1374 in the archives of the Archdiocese of Đakovo–Osijek reportedly mentions sheepdogs in Croatia, using the Latin phrase canis pastoralis croaticus.

In about 1935 the agronomist and veterinary surgeon Stjepan Romić started selectively breeding black Slavonian dogs, leading to the development of the modern Croatian Shepherd Dog. Examples of the breed were shown in 1949 at a dog show in Zagreb, at that time the capital of the Socialist Republic of Croatia; a breed standard was drawn up in 1951 by Otto Rohr. The breed was definitively accepted by the Fédération Cynologique Internationale in 1967.

== Characteristics ==
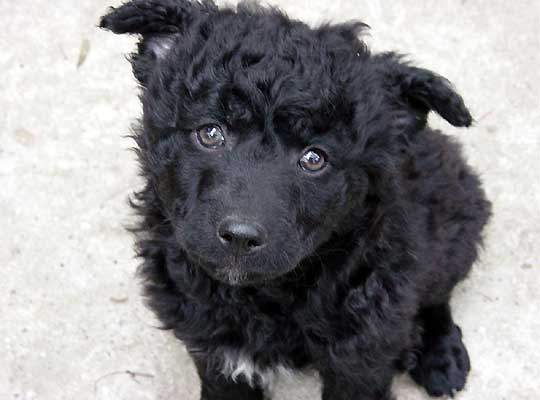
A puppy

The Croatian Shepherd Dog is of medium size: dogs stand some 45–50 cm at the withers, bitches about 2 cm less; for dogs of exceptionally good conformation and type, the breed standard allows a tolerance of up to 3 cm over or under the standard limits. The coat is double on most of the body, consisting of a dense soft undercoat and a long soft topcoat, either curly or wavy, with a length varying from 6 to 14 cm; the hair on the face, ears and lower legs is short. The coat is always black, although some limited white markings are tolerated.

== Use ==
The Croatian Shepherd has a well-developed herding instinct, and is used both as a sheepdog and as a watchdog.
