= Rieden, Upper Palatinate =

Rieden
- Municipality
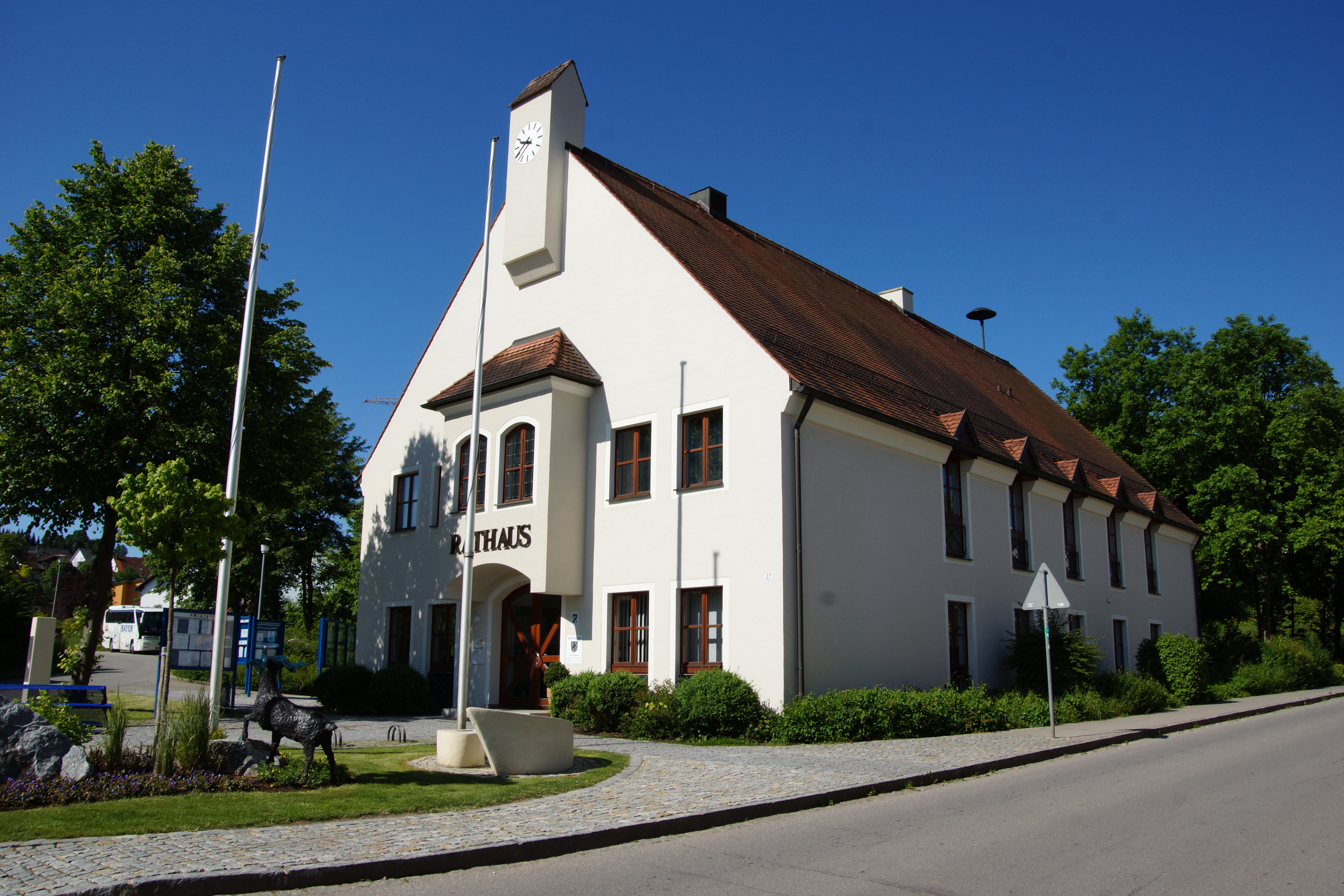
- Town hall

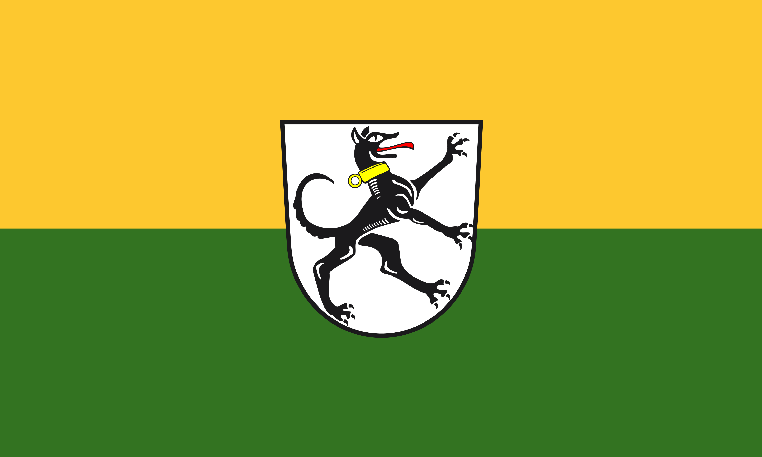
- Flag Coat of arms

- Location of Rieden within Amberg-Sulzbach district
- Interactive map of Rieden
- Location within Germany Location within Bavaria
- Coordinates: 49°19′N 11°57′E
- Country: Germany
- State: Bavaria
- Admin. region: Oberpfalz
- District: Amberg-Sulzbach

Government
  - Mayor (2020–26): Erwin Geitner (CSU)

Area
  - Total: 32.3 km^{2} (12.5 sq mi)
- Elevation: 365 m (1,198 ft)

Population (2025-12-31)
  - Total: 2,619
  - Density: 81.1/km^{2} (210/sq mi)
- Time zone: UTC+01:00 (CET)
  - Summer (DST): UTC+02:00 (CEST)
- Postal codes: 92286
- Dialling codes: 09624
- Vehicle registration: AS
- Website: www.rieden.com

Rieden (German pronunciation: [ˈʁiːdn̩]) is a municipality in the district of Amberg-Sulzbach in Bavaria in Germany.

== Geography ==
Apart from Rieden the municipality consists of the following villages:

- Aufheim
- Brunnschlag
- Degelhof
- Ettsdorf
- Fischeröd
- Gattershof
- Hammerberg
- Hirschhof
- Kamerlhof
- Kreuth
- Oed
- Schönhof
- Siegenhofen
- Taubenbach
- Vilshofen
- Vilswörth
