= Pyrenean Sheepdog =

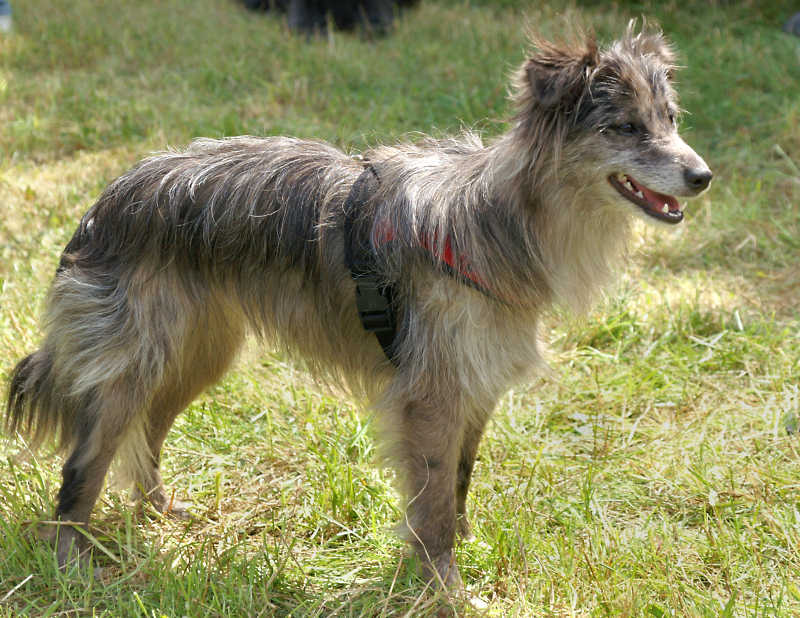
- Smooth-faced Pyrenean Sheepdog

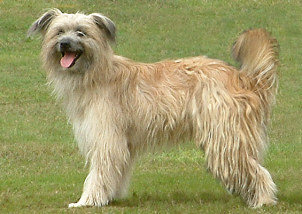
- Pyrenean Sheepdog Long-Haired
- Other names: French: Chien de Berger des Pyrénées; Berger des Pyrénées; Labrit; Labri; Pyrenees Sheepdog
- Common nicknames: Petit Berger (Little Shepherd)
- Origin: France
Traits
Height	Males	40–54 cm (16–21 in)
	Females	38–52 cm (15–20 in)
- Weight: 8–15 kg (18–33 lb)
- Coat: Long or semi-long and dense
- Colour: Fawn, grey brindle, black or blue, can be overlaid with black and sometimes with a little white on the chest and on the limbs
Kennel club standards
- SCC: Smooth-Faced standard
- SCC: Long-Haired standard
- Fédération Cynologique Internationale: Smooth-Faced standard Long-Haired standard

The Pyrenean Sheepdog, the Chien de Berger des Pyrénées in French, is a small to medium-sized breed of herding dog from the Pyrenees Mountains region of France. It is found herding flocks of sheep throughout the Pyrenees alongside the much larger Pyrenean Mountain Dog which is kept as a flock guardian.

The Pyrenean Sheepdog is found in three coat types, the long-haired and goat-haired (together called the Chien de Berger des Pyrénées À Poil Long) as well as the smooth-faced (called the Chien de Berger des Pyrénées À Face Rase); the latter is recognised as a separate breed from the former two by the Société Centrale Canine.

== History ==
The Pyrenean Sheepdog is found along the entire length of the French Pyrenees and is even known in Basque Country to the west. The breed is one of a number of similar rough-coated sheep herding-type breeds found throughout Europe including the Briard and Berger Picard from France, the Barbado da Terceira and Cao da Serra de Aires from the Azores and Portugal, the Polish Lowland Sheepdog from Poland, the Gos d'atura from Catalonia, the Pastore Fonnese from Sardinia, the Bearded Collie, Border Collie, Rough Collie and extinct Welsh Hillman from Britain, the Schafpudel from Germany, and the Schapendoes from Holland, as well as the Armant from Egypt (descended from French Briards). A number of scholars believe it is possible the ancestors of these herding-type dogs were introduced to Europe during Indo-European migrations over 4,000 years ago, and they spread throughout the continent evolving through selective breeding into the regional breeds with certain physical characteristics to suit the demands or preferences of the region.

Traditionally the Pyrenean Sheepdog is one of two breeds maintained by shepherds in the Pyrenees, the larger Pyrenean Mountain Dog was used as a flock guardian, protecting flocks from depredation from local predators (in particular wolves), as well as from thieves; the smaller Pyrenean Sheepdog was used to herd the flocks, an important function over the summer months when the flocks are grazed on mountain pastures.

The Pyrenean Sheepdog was first recognised by the Société Centrale Canine in 1926; today they recognise it as two breeds, the first the long-haired or Chien de Berger des Pyrénées À Poil Long and the second the smooth-faced or Chien de Berger des Pyrénées À Face Rase.

The Pyrenean Sheepdog is still used as a herding dog in the Pyrenees region, in France the breed is sometimes called the Labrit or Labri or the Berger des Pyrénées, it is often referred to as the Petit Berger which means Little Shepherd.

== Description ==
=== Appearance ===
The Pyrenean Sheepdog is a small to medium-sized breed (it is the smallest French herding breed) that resembles as small Berger Picard; they usually stand between 38 and 56 centimetres (15 and 22 in); the breed standards state the long-haired dogs are 40 to 50 centimetres (16 to 20 in) and bitches 38 to 48 centimetres (15 to 19 in) whilst smooth-faced dogs are 40 to 54 centimetres (16 to 21 in) and bitches 40–52 centimetres (16–20 in). The breed weighs between 8 and 15 kilograms (18 and 33 lb). The breed has a lean, athletic build which gives them both speed and endurance as is typical of smaller herding dogs; the varieties are anatomically almost identical, although the smooth-faced variety is described as being slightly shorter in the body and having more compact feet. The breed is considered very hardy and its build gives it impressive stamina, particularly so given the altitudes it works in, it easily covers over 32 kilometres (20 mi) in a day.

The Pyrenean Sheepdog's coat can be medium (known as goat-haired) or long, the long-haired varieties have longer hair on the face whilst the smooth-faced variety has much shorter hair on its face. The breed's coat provides excellent protection from extreme weather, particularly the long-haired variety, the variations seen in the breed's coats is an indication that the breed is primarily bred for working ability and not appearance. The breed can be fawn, grey, blue, brindle or black in colour which can be overlaid with black and also can have some white on the chest and limbs.

Traditionally the Pyrenean Sheepdog's ears and tail were docked although this custom is no longer common due to the procedures being restricted/ banned in numerous countries.

=== Temperament ===
The Pyrenean Sheepdog is an extremely active breed, sometimes described as a 'ball of fire', it is very intelligent and quick-witted, mischievous, has quick reactions and abundant nervous energy; like many breeds of sheepdogs the breed is rather wary of strangers although the smooth-faced variety is said to be less so.

== See also ==
- List of dog breeds
