= Kromfohrländer =

German breed of dog

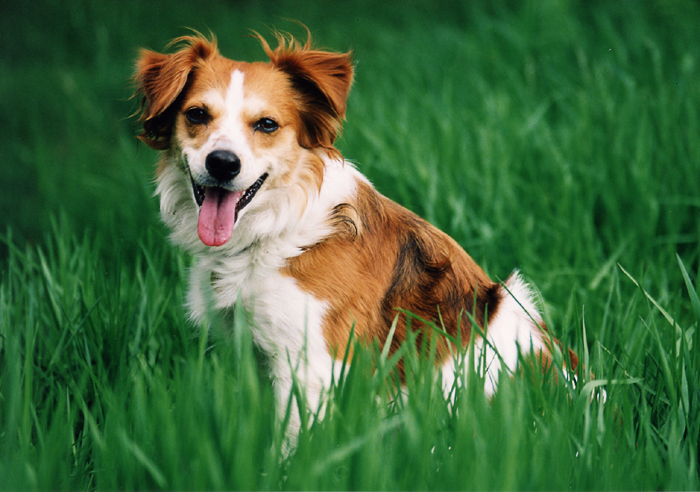
- Origin: Germany
Traits
- Height: 38–46 cm (15–18 in)
Weight	Males	11–16 kg (25–35 lb)
	Females	9–14 kg (20–30 lb)
- Colour: white with brown patches, the brown varying from light to very dark
Kennel club standards
- Verband für das Deutsche Hundewesen: standard
- Fédération Cynologique Internationale: standard

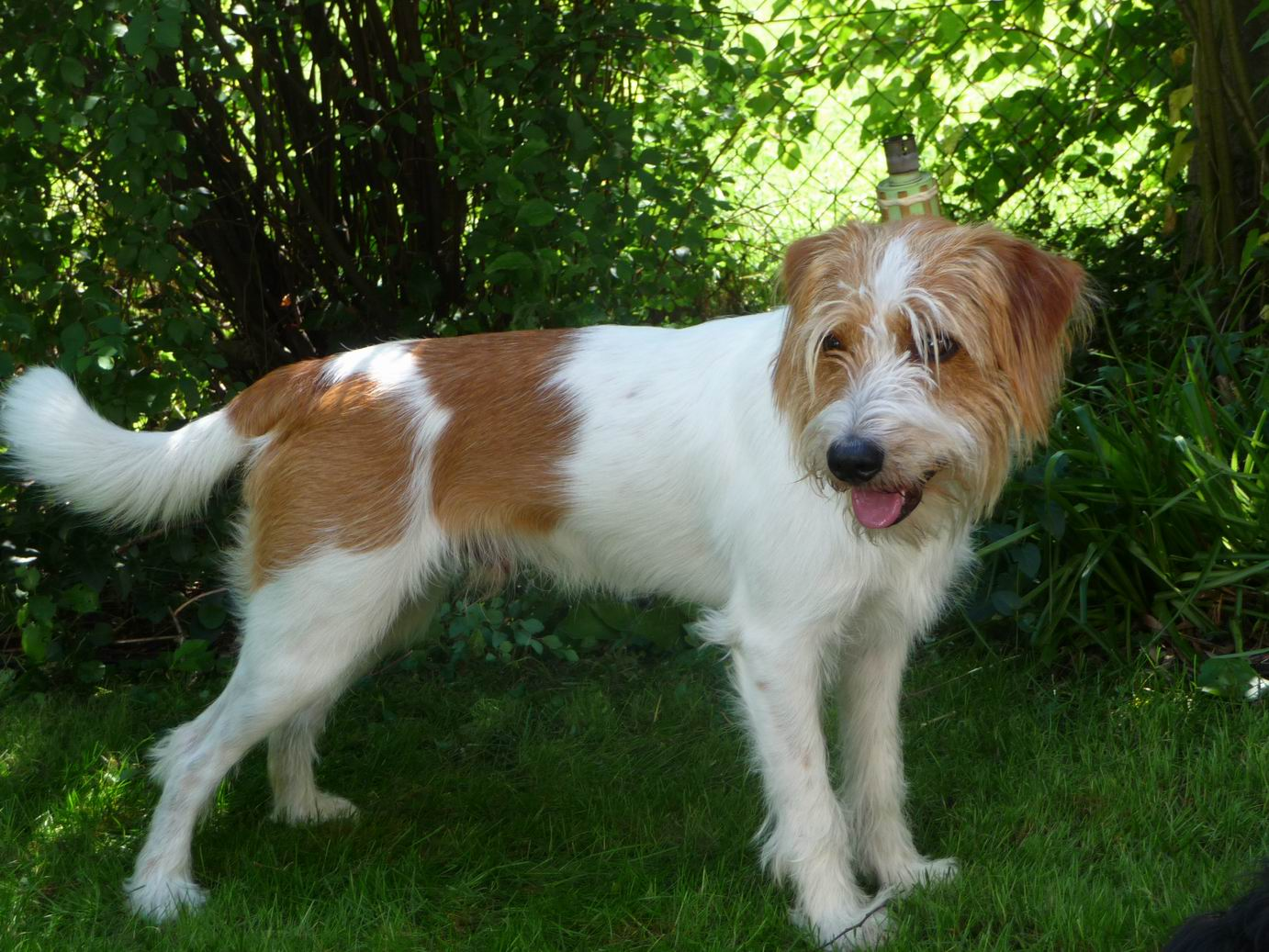
The rough-haired

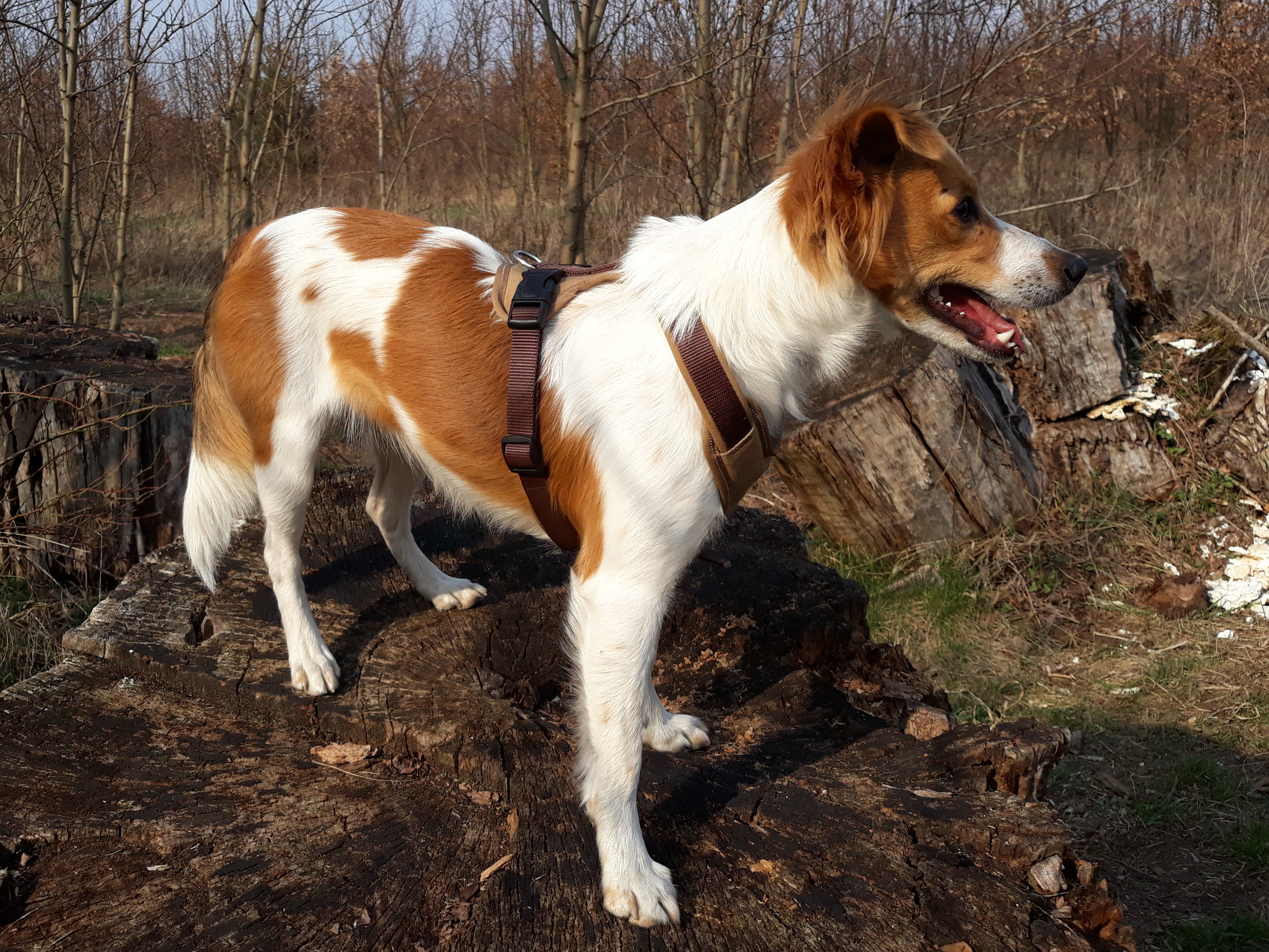
The smooth-haired

The Kromfohrländer (Note: /ˈkroʊmfərlændər/) is a modern German breed of companion dog. It originated in Germany in the years after the end of the Second World War. There are two coat types, a smooth-haired and a rough-haired.

== History ==
The Kromfohrländer breed was created in the Siegerland region of North Rhine-Westphalia by Ilsa Schleifenbaum, a former concert pianist, in the years after the end of the Second World War. In 1945, during the Allied invasion of Germany, a young dog brought from France by American troops was lost or abandoned in the area of Hilchenbach, near Siegen. It was taken in by Schleifenbaum, who named it Peter; she believed it to be a Grand Griffon Vendéen. A chance mating of this dog with a neighbour's dog, an elderly unpedigreed bitch of Fox Terrier type named Fiffi, gave rise to a litter of puppies which resembled each other much more closely than is usual in such cross-breeds, and were also unlike dogs of any other breed. A vet from Siegen named Tollmächer advised the owners of the two dogs to repeat the mating, and a further six litters were whelped. After the death of Fiffi, Peter was mated with two of his daughters from the first litter.

Schleifenbaum began to try to establish the dogs as a new breed, and started a kennel with the name 'vom Wellersberg'; a second kennel, 'vom Lenneberg', was started by her friend Otto Borner.

In 1955 the Kromfohrländer was recognised by the Verband für das Deutsche Hundewesen and was also definitively accepted by the Fédération Cynologique Internationale. It was first shown at an international dog show in Dortmund in the same year.

The Schleifenbaums had a summer residence in an area of the Ginsberger Heide called the Krumme Furche ('crooked farrow'); in Siegerländisch this became 'Krom Fohr', and from this the name of the breed derived.

The Finnish breeder Maria Åkerblom saw three of the dogs at a dog show in Oldenburg in 1956. She later bought several – among them a bitch from Schleifenbaum's kennel – and started breeding them in Finland; the first litter was whelped in 1962. Finland became a second centre of the breed – in some years more dogs were born and registered there than in Germany. From 1970 the Kromfohrländer was present in Switzerland; it later reached Denmark, the Netherlands and the United States.

In the fifteen years from 2008 to 2022 the average number of puppies whelped per year in Germany was approximately 200, representing about 0.25% of the average total number of births for all breeds, recorded at just under 80000 per year.

== Characteristics ==
The Kromfohrländer is of medium size, with a height at the withers in the range 38 to 46 cm. Dogs weigh some 11–16 kg, bitches about 2 kg less. There are two types of coat, a rough-haired (Rauhaar) and a smooth-haired (Glatthaar): the rough is coarse-haired and bearded, with longer hair on the muzzle and face, while the hair coat of the smooth variant is soft and lies close to the body. The coat is thick in both types, with soft undercoat; hair length ranges from 3 to 7 cm. The coat is white with patches of brown, this ranging from light brown through red-brown or tan to very dark; on the head the brown forms two symmetrical patches including and surrounding the ears and extending to the eyes and cheeks, while on the body it may appear as a saddle or as one or more irregular patches.
