= Pumi dog =

Pumi
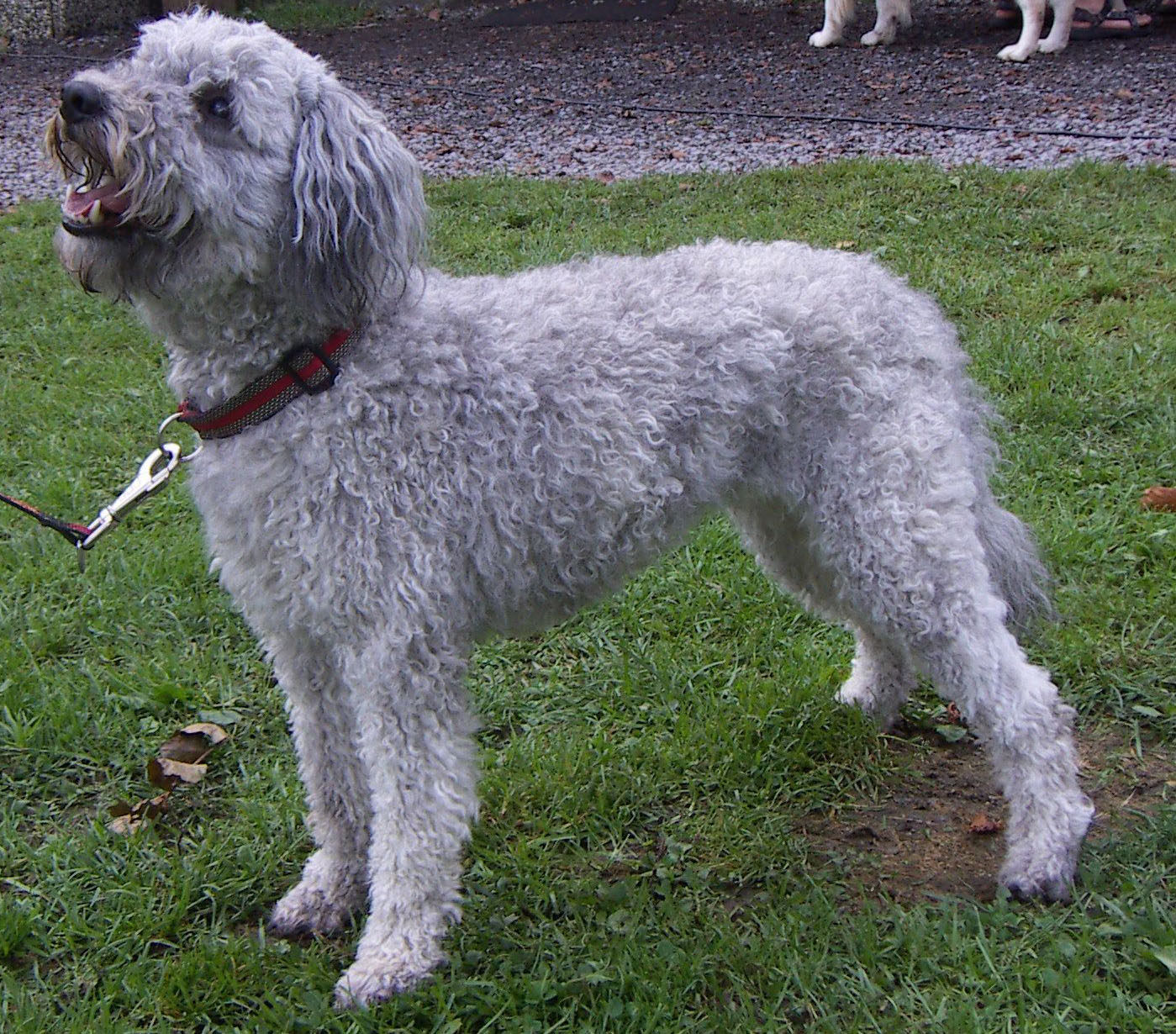
- Other names: Hungarian Pumi
- Origin: Hungary
Traits
Height	Males	43–45 cm (17–18 in)
	Females	40–42 cm (16–17 in)
Weight	Males	12–13 kg (26–29 lb)
	Females	10–11 kg (22–24 lb)
- Coat: Wavy or curly. Elastic, shaggy and dense.
- Colour: Grey, black, white or fawn.
- Litter size: 4–6 puppies
Kennel club standards
- Fédération Cynologique Internationale: standard

The Pumi (in Hungarian, the plural form is pumik) is a medium-small breed of sheep dog from Hungary. They are capable herding dogs, able to gather and work close to farm stock, particularly sheep, to keep them under control. Pumis have an extended, tapered muzzle with prominent ears, and a tail curled over their back, and are sometimes described as having a whimsical expression. The double coat (black, white, grey, or fawn) has a mix of wavy and curly hair.

The Pumi is considered to have arisen from the cross-breeding of Hungarian Puli with French and German herding dogs from the 17th century onwards. The international breed standard was approved in 1935. The Pumi became an officially recognised breed in the US in 2011 and in the UK in 2015. There are over 2,000 Pumis registered in Hungary, with notable populations in Finland and Sweden and small but growing numbers of registrations in the US, UK and Germany.

Some refer to the Pumi as the "Hungarian herding terrier" because it has some terrier-like attributes such as quick movement, alert temperament, and a quadratic, lean and muscular body type.

== Description ==
=== Appearance ===
The coat is curly, thick, and of medium length

Pumis are medium-sized dogs that can be in varying shades of grey, white, or fawn (known as 'fako' in Hungary). Grey Pumis are the most common, born black, and ranging from almost black to light grey in adulthood. Puppies usually start greying at six to eight weeks old and the shade progressively lightens. The final shade is predicted by the colour of the parents. Other accepted colours are black, white, and cream to red with a darker mask, known as fawn with mask. An analysis of 1023 Pumi puppies carried out in 2009 by the University of Debrecen found that 56% were born black turning grey, 14% were black, 13% white, 11% grey, and 4% are fawn-coloured. Brown, mottled or blue-merle-coloured puppies are born occasionally.

The thick coat is curly and of medium length approximately 4–7 cm (1.6–2.8 in) long and consisting of a harsh topcoat and soft undercoat, which provides good insulation and enables the dog to tolerate extremes of weather. The coat grows constantly (similar to that of the Poodle) and, if grooming is not maintained, it may start matting. The adult coat begins to grow at about nine months of age, and has little to no shedding. The coat is maintained by combing every few weeks, and trimming every two to four months. The Pumi is known for its alert and lively ears, which are high-set and carried semi-erect and with longer hair than the body.

The Pumi is a square, light-bodied dog which looks somewhat larger because of its thick coat with a long, narrow head. The muzzle is 45% of the length of the head, which is of equal length to the neck. The stop is barely noticeable, and the skull is flat when seen from the side. The eyes are small, dark, and slightly oblique. Movements are lively and energetic as is the Pumi itself.

Male Pumis stand 41 to 47 cm (16 to 19 in) at the withers and weigh 10 to 15 kg (22 to 33 lb); bitches are 38 to 44 cm (15 to 17 in) and weigh 8 to 13 kg (18 to 29 lb).

=== Temperament ===
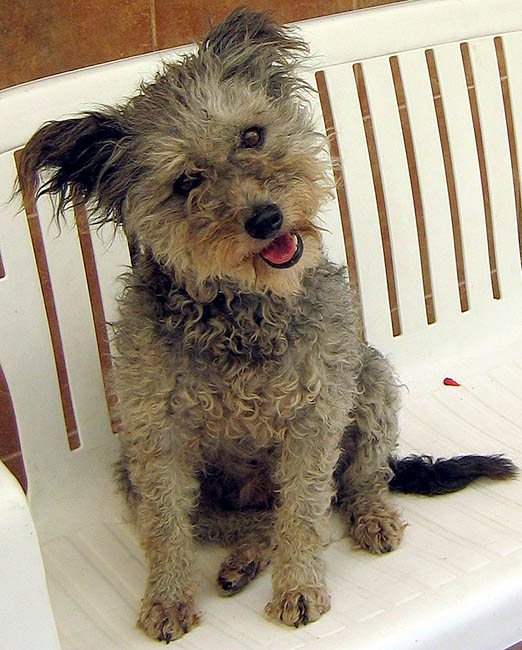

The Pumi is an alert, expressive, bold, and somewhat vocal breed. They can be very protective of their own families. Early socialisation is important.

Pumis are considered intelligent and bark easily, but are easy to train. As a herding dog, the Pumi is intelligent and alert, and should be kept busy with activities such as herding, dog agility and trick and obedience training, and given plenty of exercise. Pumis are good with children and other animals, as long as they are trained from an early age. It retains a playful temperament into adulthood and this, together with its tufted ears, gives its Hungarian nickname, "the clown".

A well-socialised Pumi with mental stimulation and plenty of physical activity should not have behavioural problems, but some natural behaviours that might become a problem if not managed properly include digging, barking, and a tendency to try to herd people. The Pumi was bred as a herding dog and it is still so used today, working close to and driving livestock with its rapid movement, barking, and the occasional nip. It has also acted as a guard dog barking at any strange person or animal. Consequently, it can be a vocal breed and dogs that are not engaged in farm work should be discouraged from barking unnecessarily. The Pumi can be protective and stubborn.

== Name ==
The name "Pumi" was first used in 1815. The name may have been derived from "Puli"; the two names were used interchangeably for centuries, often depending on the region where the animal was from. Alternatively, the name might have been derived from the German word "pummel" ("puppy") or from the word "Pomeranian", the origin of many German herding dogs used for cross-breeding. The most commonly accepted theory, from Otto Hermann, is that the name originated in "pommern", the short name of the Pomeranian Spitz. This was also accepted by Emil Raitsits in 1924.

== History ==
This breed emerged in the 17th–18th Century as a descendent from the Puli, German Spitz, French Briard and some type of terrier. The breed was first mentioned by name in 1815 but it was regarded by many as a regional variation of the Puli. In 1921, the breed was recognised as a distinct breed when Emil Raitsitz distinguished the Pumi from the Puli by writing a separate breed standard for the Pumi.

The breed evolved spontaneously and was not the result of planned breeding. Pulis were cross-bred with German Pomeranians and Spitzes, French Briards, and several varieties of terriers during the 17th and 18th century. In the 18th century, many Merino sheep were imported to Hungary, along with small Pyrenean Mountain Dogs that probably contributed to development of the Pumi producing dogs with a shorter and curlier coat. The first known drawing of a Pumi is from 1815.

The breeding of pedigree dogs began on the initiative of Count István Széchenyi, founder of the Hungarian Academy of Science. Within the Austro-Hungarian empire, during the later part of the 19th century, breeding of native Hungarian dogs was not encouraged. During the early twentieth century, Hungarians separated their herding dogs into the various breeds according to their phenotypes, and so the first distinction between Puli and Pumi was published in 1902. The Puli was most common on the east Hungarian plains the Pumi in the hills of west Hungary with the Mudi common in southern Hungary. In the 1910s, controlled breeding began, but many large herds and their dogs were lost during the First World War, and the subsequent division of Hungary.

Dr Emil Raitsits who created the Pumi breed standard in 1921, referred to it as a "sheepdog terrier". Numbers rose between the wars with 130 of the dogs registered in 1924 when they were seen in the show ring and as working dogs. Raitsits was keen to preserve its typical terrier qualities. Before 1923, Pumis had been shown as local varieties of Pulis, but, by 1927, the two breeds had been officially separated. The Pumi standard was approved by the FCI in 1935 along with the scientific name Canis familiaris ovilis villosus terrarius-Raitsitsi. This had been proposed by Csaba Anghi to reflect the great deal of terrier in the Pumi both in its features and character. The early breed standards, focused on the differences between the related breeds noting for the Pumi with its distinctive features such as a longer muzzle, smoother stop line, upright folding ears, and its non-corded coat.

During the Second World War, food shortages and lack of veterinary care reduced their numbers again and many dogs were shot by soldiers. Ria Hörter wrote that "Ilona Orlay, one of Dr Raitsits's assistants, walked through a burning Budapest pushing a chart [sic, ?cart] containing valuable Hungarian sheepdog papers, from the office of the Hungarian Kennel Club to a place of safety."

Breeding became possible again in the period after the 1956 uprising. The 1960 breed standard, which remained current through to the 1980s, allowed any solid coat colour, but the variations seen within the breed during the 1950s had since been reduced. It was first exported to Finland in 1973 and Sweden in 1985 and then to Italy and the Netherlands and the US in the early 1990s. The current international breed standard dates from September 2000. In 2016, the Hungarian government named the Pumi as one of its eight indigenous dog breeds, created a gene bank to preserve its characteristics, and announced support for breeding at the Hungarian national breeding centres.

== Health ==
Pumis have a typical life expectancy of 12 to 14 years. Known medical issues are a knee problem called patella luxation and canine hip dysplasia. Responsible breeders have DNA testing performed for degenerative myelopathy and an eye disease called primary lens luxation, although neither is common. They also screen for patellar luxation and sometimes for elbow dysplasia.

A study looking at a million dogs that had undergone genetic screening identified the gene RPGRIP1 as being prevalent in 4.65% of Pumi dogs. This gene is responsible for cone-rod dystrophy.

=== Hip Dysplasia ===
Hip dysplasia is an abnormal formation of the hip socket that can lead to serious joint problems for the dog. It is a genetic trait also affected by environmental factors, and can be identified by X-Ray. It is probably the most common health problem specific to the breed. Tests on 329 Pumis in the US between 1991 and 2021 found that 9.4 per cent had abnormal hips.

Health records of the breed from Finland and Sweden indicate that 80 per cent of the Pumis born there have healthy hips.

=== Degenerative Myelopathy ===
Degenerative myelopathy is an incurable, progressive disease of the canine spinal cord, found typically after the age of seven years. Pumis can be carriers of the trigger gene. DNA testing can identify those dogs that are carriers, and these should not be bred with other carriers. 9.7 per cent of 227 Pumis tested in the US between 2001 and 2021 were found to be carriers.

=== Primary Lens Luxation ===
Primary Lens Luxation is a dislocation of the eye's lens. This is also a genetic disease, for which the carrier gene can be identified by DNA testing. Of 228 Pumis tested in the US between 2001 and 2021, 12.3 per cent were found to be carriers.

=== Elbow Dysplasia ===
Elbow dysplasia involves developmental abnormalities of the elbow-joint, and the growth of cartilage or the structures surrounding it, leading to osteoarthritis. As of 2016, none of the Pumi tested in the UK have recorded abnormal scores.

=== Testing ===
According to the Hungarian Pumi Club of America, the tests that are recommended for the Pumi are:

- Hip Dysplasia (X-ray)
- Patellar Luxation (veterinary certification)
- Primary Lens Luxation (DNA test)
- Degenerative Myelopathy (DNA Test)
- Eye examination by an ophthalmologist (optional)
- Elbow Dysplasia (optional) (X-ray)
- DNA repository (optional) (blood sample)

== Activities ==
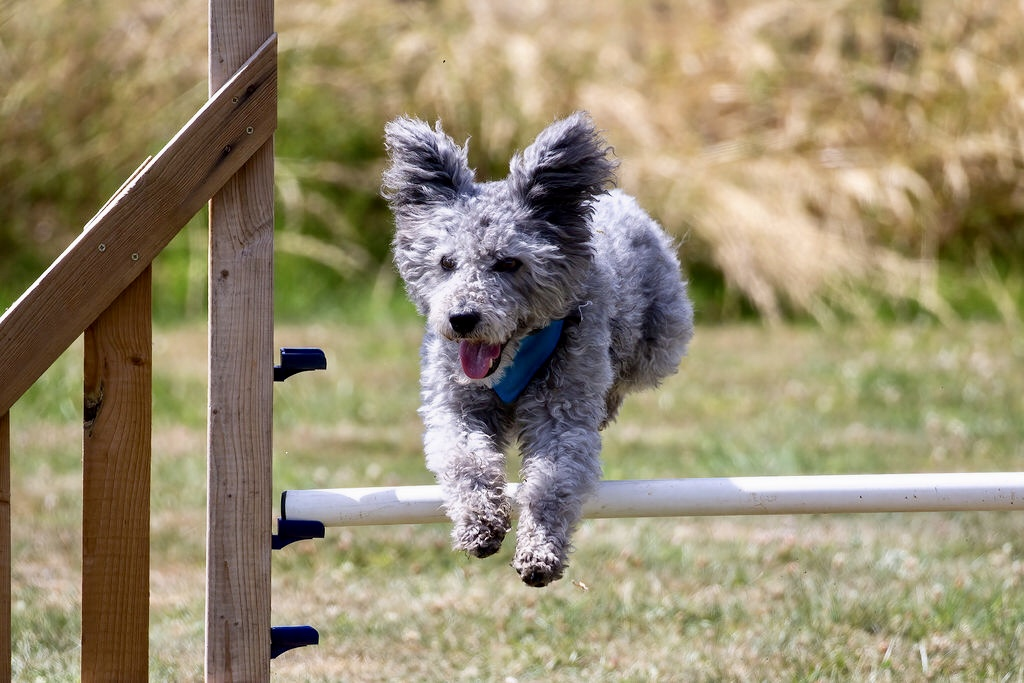
Pumis enjoy dog agility

The Pumi was originally used as a herding dog and most working sheepdogs in Hungary are Pumis. However, today many are used for dog agility, dog dancing, and obedience. They also can be trained for detection, search and rescue, and other purposes. Since the Pumi was originally used for herding, they are eligible to compete in herding events; appropriate instinct and trainability can be measured at noncompetitive tests. Pumis that exhibit basic herding instincts can be trained to compete in trials. Pumis have also been used for hunting wild boar.

== Recognition ==
The Pumi is little known outside Hungary where in 2015 there were 2,064 registered dogs. The first Pumis were introduced into Finland in 1973, and Sweden and Finland have registered around 100 Pumis every year. In both countries, the Pumi is a popular agility dog seen in championship competitions, and also used for competitive obedience and dog dancing. At the end of 2014, there were about 881 Pumis registered in Finland, 74 in the Netherlands, 111 in Germany, 84 in the Czech Republic, 36 in France, 29 in the UK, 9 in Ireland, 10 in Ukraine, 10 in Estonia, 2 in Latvia, 5 in Slovenia, 1 in Spain and 5 in Japan.

In 2004, the Pumi was accepted to the American Kennel Club Foundation Stock Service program and the Hungarian Pumi Club of America was founded. On 1 January 2011, the Pumi was accepted into the AKC Miscellaneous class having achieved 150 US registrations, and, on 1 July 2016, into the Herding group with over 300 registered dogs as the 190th dog breed that the club had officially recognised.

In the UK, the Kennel Club accepted the breed standard for the Pumi in 2015. There is an active breed club, and, as of December 2023, about 300 UK registrations.

== See also ==
- Hungarian dog breeds
- List of dog breeds
