= Schapendoes =

Schapendoes Dutch Sheepdog
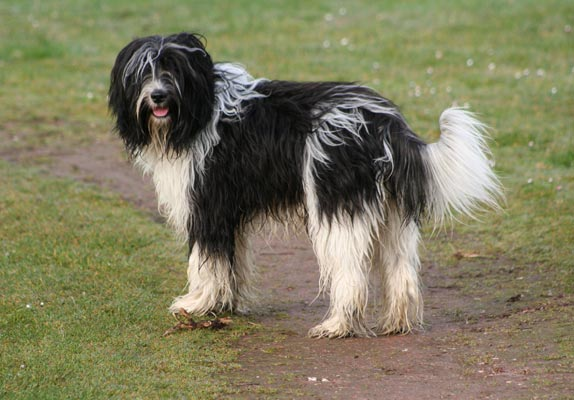
- A Schapendoes agility dog
- Other names: Dutch Schapendoes, Nederlandse Schapendoes
- Origin: Netherlands
Traits
Height	Males	43–50 cm (17–20 in)
	Females	40–47 cm (16–19 in)
- Weight: 12–25 kg (26–55 lb)
Kennel club standards
- Dutch Kennel Club: standard
- Fédération Cynologique Internationale: standard

The Schapendoes (Dutch pronunciation: [ˈsxaːpə(n)ˌdus]) is a breed of herding dog originating in the Netherlands.

== History ==
The Schapendoes descends from a general type of farm and herding dog popular in the Drenthe province of the Netherlands, and the Veluwe, an area of forests and swampland. ("does" is a local dialect meaning "swamp" see e.g. the town of Doesburg) The dogs there had many names, and were not a specific breed as we use the term today. They were the local working dog, adapted to the people, environment, and types of work needed. They were exhibited in early dog shows (in the 1870s) as Domestic herding dog.

The dogs became nearly extinct during World War II, and the modern day breed descends from the few survivors. The Dutch Raad van Beheer (national kennel club) first recognised the breed in 1952, and the first standard was written in 1954. Related breeds are the Bearded Collie, the Puli, the Polish Lowland Sheepdog (Owczarek Nizinny), the Old English Sheepdog, the Briard, the Bergamasco Shepherd Dog (Cane da pastore Bergamasco) and the Old German Sheepdog (Schafspudel), all of which are small versions of larger mountain dogs.

The breed was recognised by the Fédération Cynologique Internationale in 1971, as breed number 313 in Group 1, Section 1: Sheepdogs. Exported to the North America, the breed is recognised by the Canadian Kennel Club (as Dutch Sheepdog) and the United Kennel Club (USA) in their respective Herding groups. The American Kennel Club has listed the Schapendoes as part of its Foundation Stock Service, the first step in breed recognition.

== Appearance ==
The Schapendoes is a medium-sized dog with long, thick fur on the body, legs, tail, and face. Small ears hang down, covered with long fur. The face has a moustache and beard. The coat is of any colour.

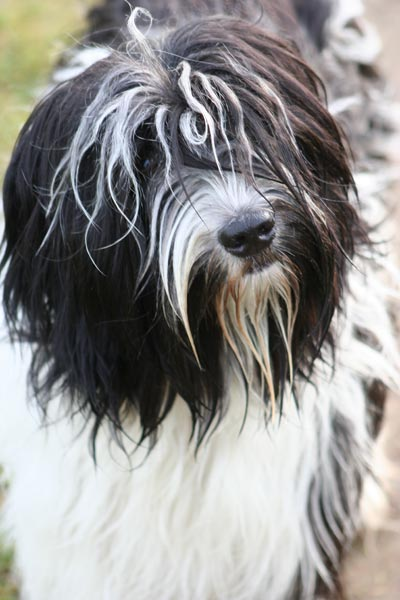

Height is up to 50 cm (19.7 in) at the withers and 12–20 kg (26–44 lb), up to 25 kg (55 lb) for males, in weight.
