= Mudi =

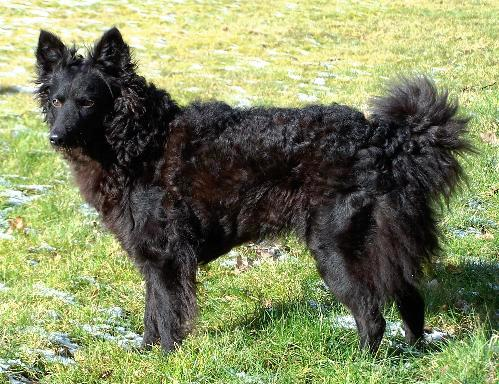
- A black Mudi
- Origin: Hungary
Traits
Height	Males	41–47 cm (16–19 in)
	Females	38–44 cm (15–17 in)
Weight	Males	11–13 kg (24–29 lb)
	Females	8–11 kg (18–24 lb)
- Coat: Head and front of limbs are covered by short, straight, and smooth hair. Elsewhere the coat is uniformly wavy or slightly curled 3–7 cm (1.2–2.8 in) long.
- Colour: Fawn. Black. Brown. Ash coloured (blue grey). Blue-merle, i.e. black speckled, estriped, -brindle or -spotted on lighter or darker bluish-grey primary colour.
Kennel club standards
- Fédération Cynologique Internationale: standard

The Mudi is a herding dog breed from Hungary. It is closely related to the Puli and Pumi, from which it was separated in the 1930s. They continue to be used in herding, as well as participating in a variety of dog sports.

== History ==
The Mudi was first discovered as a breed in 1936 by Dr Dezso Fenyes in Hungary, where it became known as the "driver dog". Mudis nearly disappeared shortly after their recognition, as many were killed off during World War II. The breed became recognized by The Federation Cynologique Internationale in 1966. On January 5, 2022, the Mudi was recognized by the American Kennel Club as a purebred breed, and by The Kennel Club on June 12, 2025, effective July 1. The Mudi made its debut at the Westminster Kennel Club Dog Show in June 2022. At the breed's inaugural Westminster competition, CH Luminary Alchemist ("Guava"), owned by Samantha Van Buren, won Best of Breed, becoming the first Mudi to receive the breed award at Westminster.

== Description ==
Mudis are a high energy breed, and tend to succeed in herding and agility. Mudis have a lifespan of 12-14 years with proper care. Adult Mudis are 14-18 inches in height and usually weigh around 18-29 lbs.

=== Appearance ===
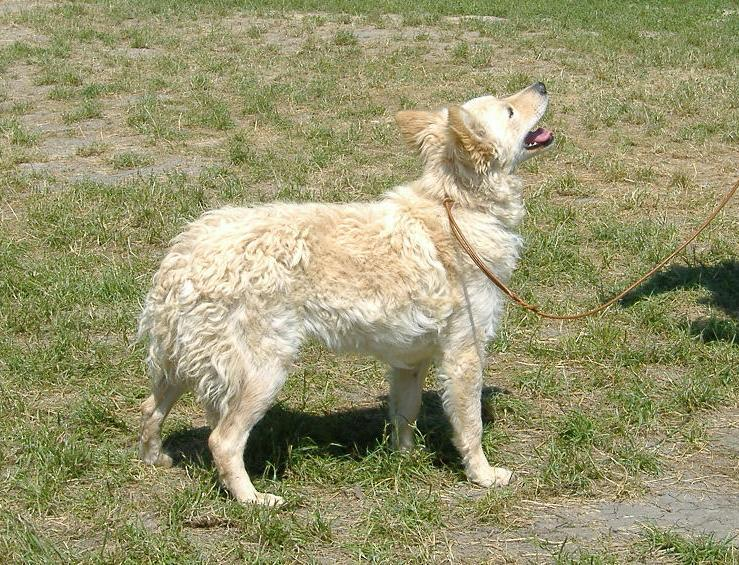
A fawn Mudi

The Mudi has a medium coat length and a curly coat type. Mudis are born with various lengths of tails from bobtails to long full length tails. Dogs born with short or natural bobtail will be indicated on the FCI pedigree.

=== Exercise and activities ===
The Mudi is a very active breed. They need to be taken on daily, long, brisk walks or jogs. In addition, they will benefit from a large safe area where they can run free. They need a lot of running and other exercises to be in good condition. They love to play and will excel in all kinds of dog sports such as Frisbee. The Mudi can compete in dog agility trials, obedience, Rally obedience, Schutzhund, showmanship, flyball, tracking, and herding events. Herding instincts and trainability can be measured at noncompetitive herding tests. Mudi that exhibit basic herding instincts can be trained to compete in herding trials.

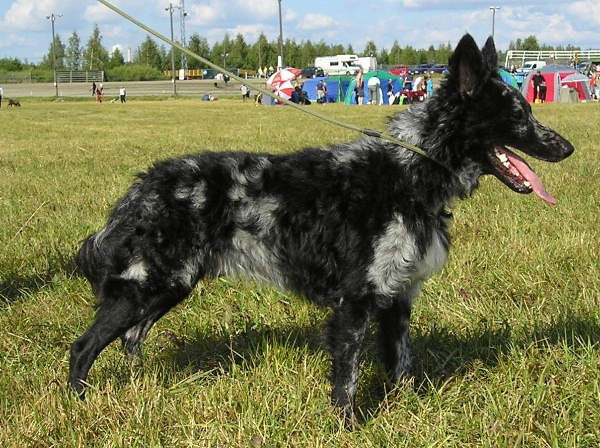
A blue merle Mudi

== See also ==
- Hungarian dog breeds
- List of dog breeds
