= List of Welsh breeds =

This is a list of both domestic and farmed breeds of animals originating in Wales.

== Domestic ==
=== Dogs ===
Breed	Image	Date of origin	Location of origin	Status
Cardigan Welsh Corgi (Welsh Corgi)		Registered separately from Pembroke Corgi in 1935	Ceredigion	Vulnerable native breed
Pembroke Welsh Corgi (Welsh Corgi)		Registered separately from Cardigan Corgi in 1935	Pembrokeshire	Not vulnerable native breed
Sealyham Terrier		First breed established in 1908 and registered by the kennel club in 1911	Sealyham House	Vulnerable native breed
Welsh Hound		Descended from Segussi of the Roman times. Existed as a breed since at least the Middle Ages; Welsh Hound Association was formed in 1922		975 hounds in 1997
Welsh Sheepdog	The breed has multiple colour variations.	Existed since the time of early Welsh law. Welsh Sheepdog Society was founded in 1997	Wales	
Welsh Springer Spaniel		Red and white Welsh hunting dog chronicled in the Middle Ages is thought to be ancestor to this breed. Recognised by the Kennel Club in 1902		Vulnerable native breed
Welsh Terrier		Origins in 13th century; First breed club formed in1885	Pwllheli	Not a vulnerable native breed
Old Welsh Grey Sheepdog				Known to exist in 1994 but now considered extinct
Welsh Hillman				Thought to become extinct in 1990

== Livestock ==
=== Cattle ===
Breed	Image	Date of origin	Location of origin	Status
Welsh Black cattle		Descended from pre-Roman Wales. Breeding between north and south Wales varieties over last 90 years has formed the breed	Stocky north Wales beef type and the more dairy-like south Wales	Endangered native breeds in Wales
"Ancient Cattle of Wales"		Ancient Cattle of Wales breed society was established in 1981	Wales	Unofficial colour varieties of Welsh cattle
Glamorgan cattle			Glamorgan	The breed was thought to have died out in the 1920s. A herd was discovered and bought in 1979 by Margam Country Park and remain there today
Vaynol cattle		1872	Vaynol Park, near Bangor	One of the rarest cattle breeds in the UK. RBST owns most of the breed and monitors their status
Pembroke cattle	"Coal Black" in colour		Pembrokeshire	Pembroke cows of Dewsland, CastleMartin varieties amalgamated with Anglesey and North Wales varieties to form Welsh Black.

=== Sheep ===
Breed	Image	Date of origin	Location of origin	Status
Badger Face Welsh Mountain sheep		Since at least the Middle Ages		
Balwen Welsh Mountain sheep		Since before 1947; Welsh mountain sheep society formed in 1985	Tywi valley	
Beulah Speckled Face		Beulah Speckled-Face Sheep Society was founded in 1958	Hills of Eppynt, Llanafan, Abergwesyn, and Llanwrtyd Wells	
Black Welsh Mountain sheep		Existed in the Middle Ages, but artificially selected to form a breed in the 19th century		
Brecon Cheviot		400 years ago; recognised in the mid-1850s	Brecon Beacons	
Welsh Hill Speckled Face		Derived from Welsh mountain sheep with some Kerry Hill sheep introduced into breeding	Devil's Bridge and hilly areas of Mid Wales	
Hill Radnor				
Kerry Hill sheep		Records as a distinct breed in 1809; First Flock Book published in 1899 with 26 members	Kerry, Powys	Registered Kerry Hill Sheep are present across the British Isles, Ireland and the Netherlands
Llanwenog sheep		Various local black faced hill breeds in the Teifi valley crossed with Shropshire sheep in West Wales in the late 19th century; The Llanwenog Breed Society was formed in 1957	Teifi valley, West Wales	Centred in West Wales and is widespread in the UK
Lleyn sheep		Bred from the Irish Roscommon sheep likely at the beginning of the 19th century	Llŷn Peninsula; Northwest Wales	seven pure-bred flocks in 1960s; more than 1000 pure breeders in the UK in 2006
Welsh Mountain sheep			Throughout Wales	

=== Pig ===
Breed	Image	Date of origin	Location of origin	Status
Welsh pig		Known in Wales from the earliest records available; Breeding programmes started in the 1950s	Wales	Registrations totaled 1,341 in 1981

=== Goose ===
Breed	Image	Date of origin	Location of origin	Status
Brecon Buff Goose		Bred from Buff geese on a Breconshire hill farm by Rhys Llewelyn in 1928; Recognised by the Poultry Club in 1934	Breconshire	

== Horse ==
Breed	Image	Date of origin	Location of origin	Status
Welsh Pony and Cob (includes multiple varieties)		Before Roman times; Welsh Pony and Cob Society founded in 1901	Wales	574 registered in 1913
