= Cambridge (sheep) =

British breed of sheep

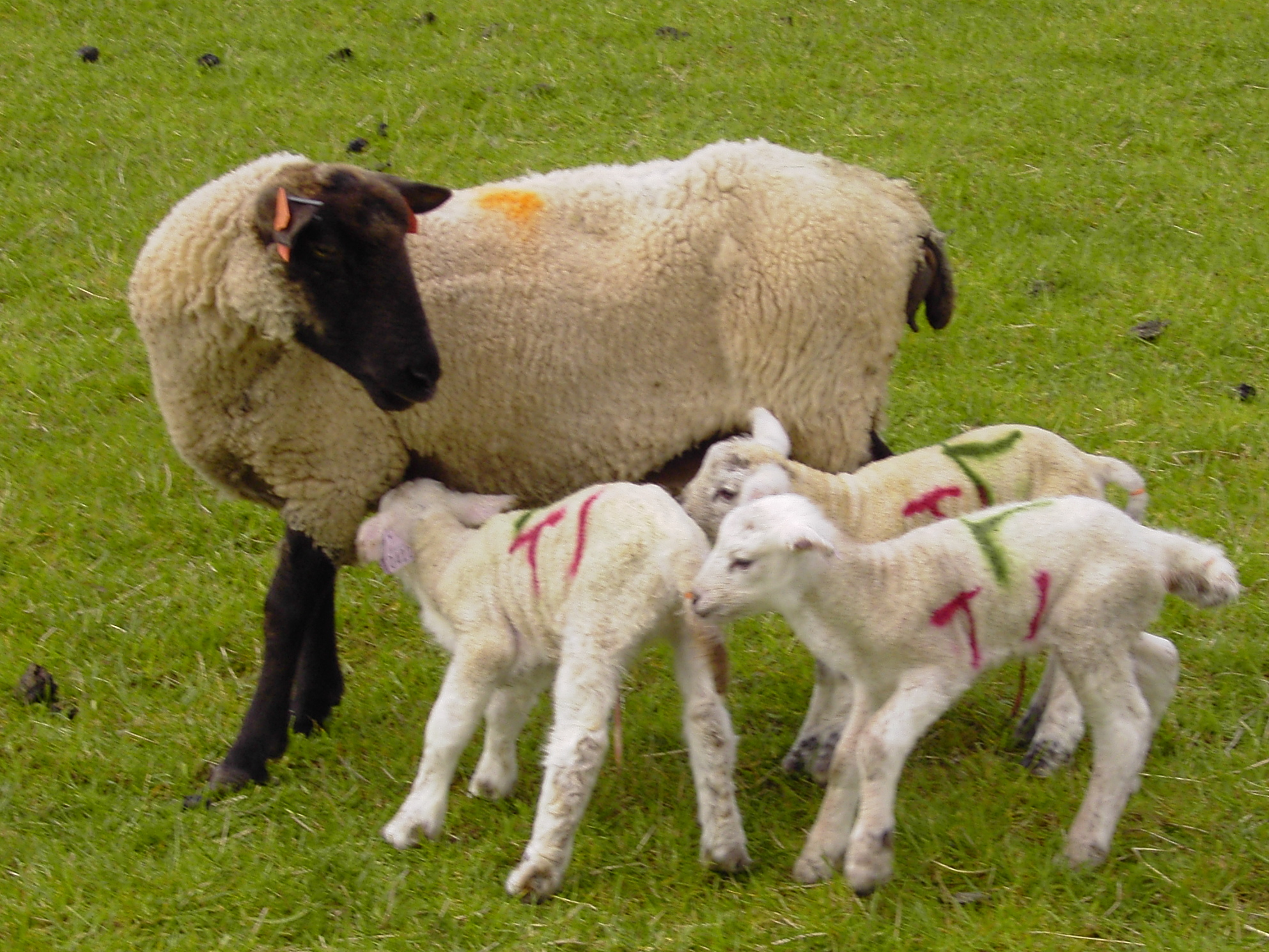
- Ewe with Texel-cross lambs
- Conservation status: FAO (2007): endangered; DAD-IS (2021): critical
- Country of origin: United Kingdom
- Distribution: England; Wales
- Use: meat

Traits
- Weight: Male: average 90 kg; Female: average 70 kg
- Height: Male: average 72 cm; Female: average 66 cm
- Wool colour: uni-coloured brown
- Face colour: brown
- Horn status: polled (hornless)

The Cambridge is a modern British breed of domestic sheep. It was bred at the University of Cambridge by John Owen and Alun Davies between about 1964 and 1979, with the aim of increasing prolificacy. It is among the most prolific of all sheep breeds, but is critically endangered.

== History ==
The Cambridge was bred at the University of Cambridge by John Owen and Alun Davies between about 1964 and 1979, with the specific aim of increasing prolificacy. Ewes of a variety of British breeds were put to Finnsheep rams. These ewes were mostly of the Clun Forest breed, but Border Leicester, Hill Radnor, Kerry Hill, Llanwenog, Lleyn and Ryeland stock was also used.A flock-book was started in 1969, and by 1979 the breed was established.

== Characteristics ==
The Cambridge is a polled sheep of medium to large size. It is uniformly brown, with a brown face. It is a short-wool breed; fleeces weigh some 2.5 kg, with a staple length of about 100 mm.

Ewes of the breed are among the most prolific of any breed of sheep, with average litter sizes for one-, two- and three-year-old ewes of 1.7, 2.5 and 2.9 respectively.
