= List of Italian dog breeds =

Seventeen Italian dog breeds are recognised by the Ente Nazionale della Cinofilia Italiana, of which fifteen are recognised also by the Fédération Cynologique Internationale. A further six are in the process of recognition by the ENCI. There are a number of local breeds or types without national recognition.

Name	English name if used	Recognition	Notes	Image
Bolognese		ENCI; FCI		
Bracco Italiano		ENCI; FCI		
Cane Corso	Italian Mastiff	ENCI; FCI		
Cane da Pastore Bergamasco	Bergamasco Shepherd Dog	ENCI; FCI		
Cane da Pastore della Sila; Pastore Silano		ENCI (partial)		
Cane da Pastore Abruzzese Maremmano; Maremmano	Maremmano-Abruzzese Sheepdog; Maremma	ENCI; FCI		
Cane delle Alpi Apuane; Pastore Apuano		ENCI (partial)		
Cane di Mannara		ENCI (partial)		
Cane d'Oropa; Pastore d'Oropa; Pastore Biellese		ENCI (partial)	Herding dog from the area of Biella, in Piedmont	
Cane Fonnese; Pastore Fonnese; Cane di Fonni	Sardinian Shepherd Dog	ENCI (partial)		
Cane Lupino del Gigante; Luvin		none	Shepherd dog from the Apennines of the Province of Reggio Emilia, in Emilia-Romagna	
Cane Paratore		none		
Cirneco dell'Etna		ENCI; FCI		
Dogo Sardesco; Dogo Sardo		none	Sardinia; used in the past as a guard dog and as a catch dog in hunting large game	
Lagotto Romagnolo		ENCI; FCI		
Levriero Sardo		none		
Lupo Italiano		none	Used exclusively by police and search and rescue organisations, with no private ownership	
Maltese		ENCI; FCI		
Mastino Abruzzese		regional	variant of the Maremmano	
Mastino Napoletano	Neapolitan Mastiff	ENCI; FCI		
Pastore della Lessinia e del Lagorai		ENCI (partial)		
Piccolo Levriero Italiano	Italian Sighthound; Italian Greyhound	ENCI; FCI		
Segugio dell'Appennino		ENCI; FCI		
Segugio Italiano a Pelo Forte		ENCI; FCI	sometimes treated outside Italy as a single breed	
Segugio Italiano a Pelo Raso		ENCI; FCI	sometimes treated outside Italy as a single breed	
Segugio Maremmano		ENCI; FCI		
Spino degli Iblei		ENCI		
Spinone Italiano	Italian Spinone	ENCI; FCI		
Volpino Italiano		ENCI; FCI		

== See also ==
- List of dog breeds
