= Berger Picard =

Picardy Shepherd
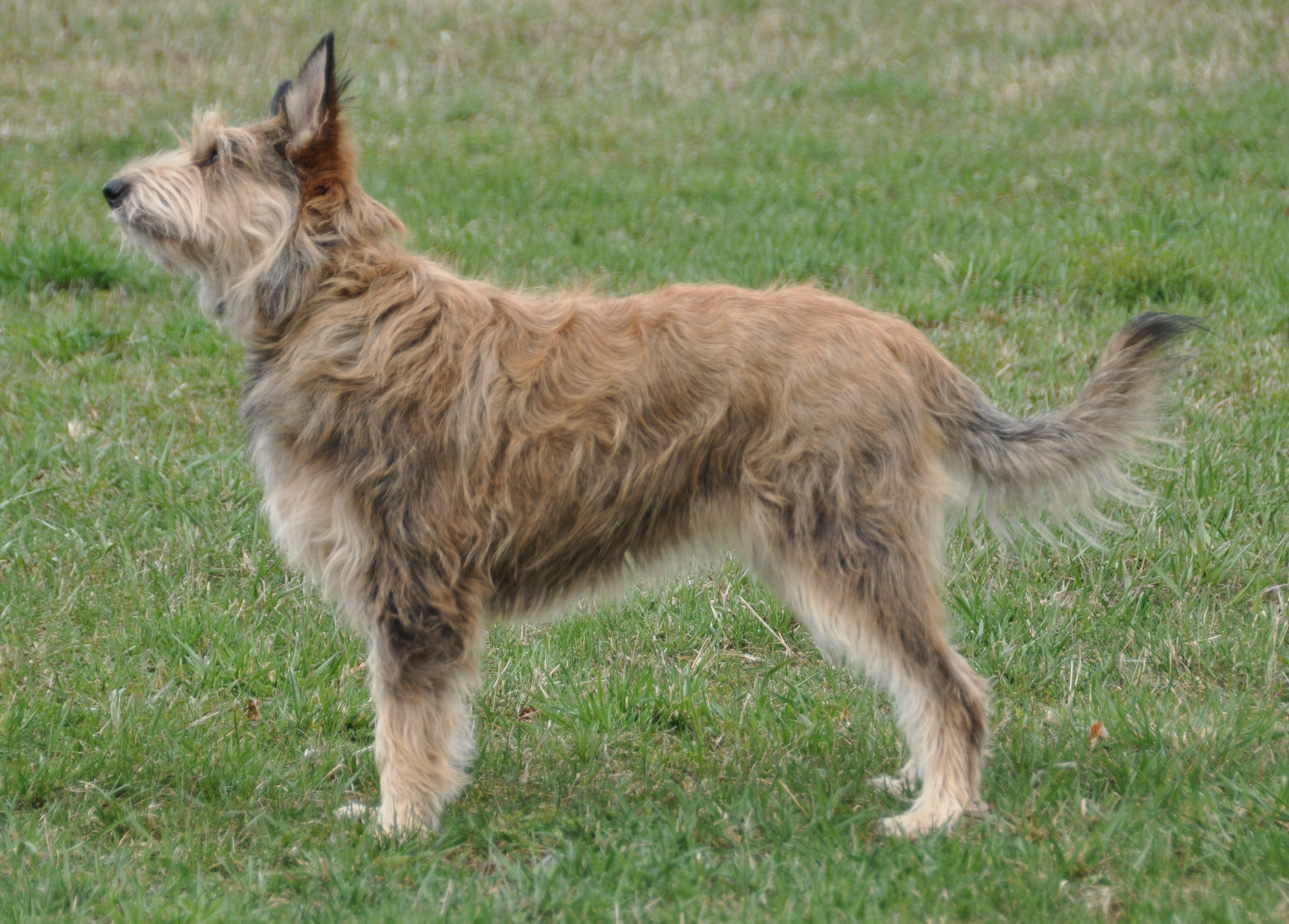
- Berger Picard
- Other names: Picard; Berger de Picardie; Picardy Sheepdog
- Origin: France
Traits
Height	Males	24–26 in (61–66 cm)
	Females	22–24 in (56–61 cm)
- Weight: 51–71 lb (23–32 kg)
- Coat: rough
- Color: fawn or brindle
- Litter size: 2–10 pups
Kennel club standards
- Société Centrale Canine: standard
- Fédération Cynologique Internationale: standard

The Berger Picard (/bɛərˌʒeɪ pɪˈkɑːr/ bair-ZHAY pih-KAR, French: [bɛʁʒe pikaʁ]) or Picardy Shepherd, is a French herding dog originating in Picardy. These dogs nearly became extinct after both World War I and World War II and remains a rare breed.

== Appearance ==
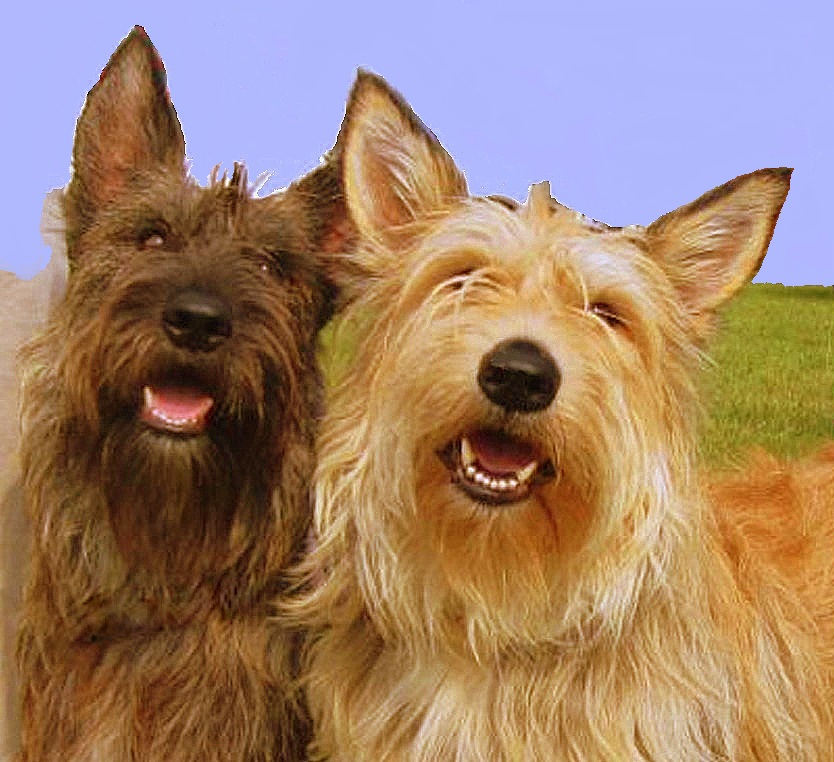
Picards of both colors.

The Berger Picard is a medium-sized, well-muscled dog, slightly longer than tall with a tousled yet elegant appearance. Their ears are naturally erect, high-set, and quite wide at the base. Their eyebrows are thick, but do not shield their dark frank eyes. They are known for their smile. Their natural tail normally reaches to the hock and is carried with a slight J-curve at the tip. Their weather-proof coat is harsh and crisp to the touch, not excessively long with a minimal undercoat. Coat colors fall into two colors, fawn and brindle, with a range of shade variations.

== Temperament ==
The Berger Picard's attributes include a lively, intelligent personality and a sensitive and assertive disposition that responds quickly to obedience training. Picards are easygoing and mellow but can be reserved towards strangers. They require a lot of socialization during the first two years of their lives.

Picards are energetic and hard working, alert, and are not excessive barkers. Some Picards are notoriously picky eaters.

The breed also has a developed sense of humor, making them endearing companions. They continue to be used effectively as both sheep and cattle herders in their native land and elsewhere.

Like many herding breeds, Picards require human companionship. Since they can be demonstrative to their owners and enthusiastic towards other animals, formal obedience training and positive socialization is important.

== Health ==
Berger Picards are a relatively healthy breed. Known medical conditions include hip dysplasia and progressive retinal atrophy (PRA). Eyes will be certified for hereditary diseases through the OFA as well (previously through the Canine Eye Research Foundation) and results should also be published on the OFA database.

The breed's life expectancy is 12 to 14 years.

== Care ==
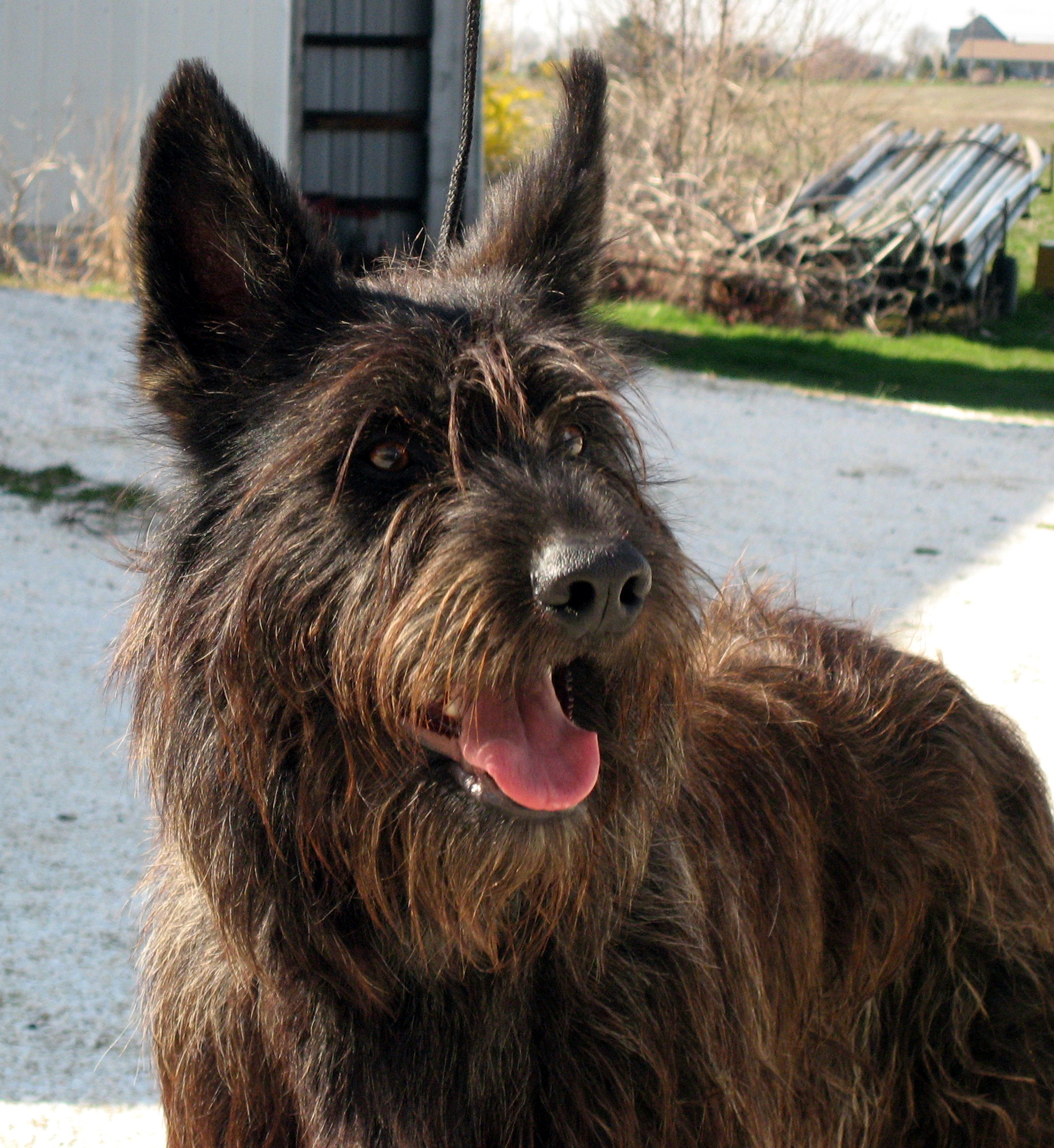

=== Exercise and activities ===
The Berger Picard can compete in agility trials, tracking, obedience, showmanship, Schutzhund, flyball, lure coursing, French ring sport and herding events. Herding instincts and trainability can be measured at noncompetitive herding tests. Berger Picards exhibiting basic herding instincts can be trained to compete in herding trials.

== History ==
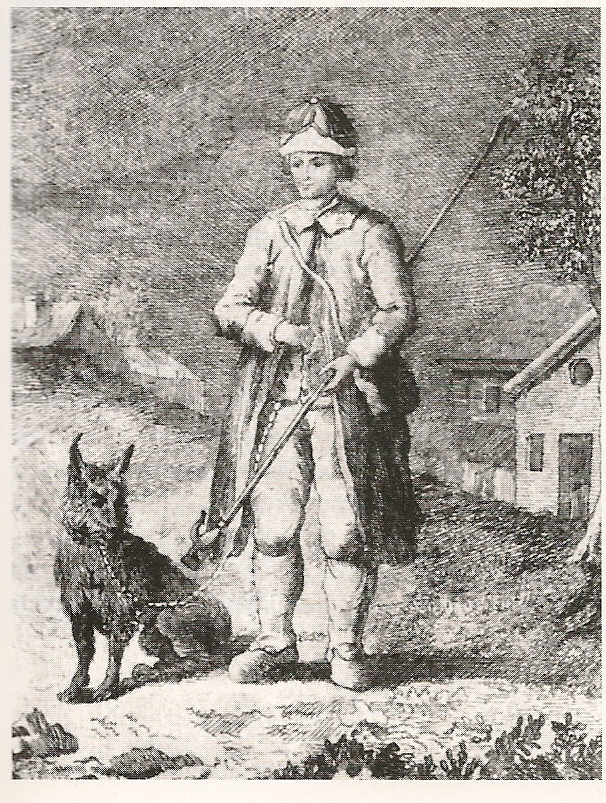
A woodcut of a Berger Picard

In 2018 a genetic study found that, just prior to 1859, a broadly distributed European herding dog had given rise to the French Berger Picard, the German Shepherd Dog, and the five Italian herding breeds: the Bergamasco Shepherd Dog, Cane Paratore, Lupino del Gigante, Pastore d'Oropa, and the Pastore della Lessinia e del Lagorai.

One author believes that the Berger Picard was brought to northern France and the Pas de Calais in the 9th century by the Franks. Some experts insist that this breed is related to the more well-known Briard and Beauceron, while others believe it shares a common origin with Dutch and Belgian Shepherds. Although the Berger Picard made an appearance at the first French dog show in 1863, the breed's rustic appearance did not lead to popularity as a show dog.

The breeding stock of the Berger Picard was decimated by the ravages of World War I and World War II. With its population concentrated on the farms of north-eastern France, trench warfare in the Somme reduced the breed to near extinction. The prevalence of the breed worldwide remains limited, even in its native country.

In France, there are approximately 3500 dogs. The Berger Picard was accepted by the Fédération Cynologique Internationale (FCI) in 1955.

Germany has approximately 500 of this breed. There are approximately 400 Berger Picards in the United States and Canada. The Berger Picard Club of America and the Berger Picard Club Canada were formed to help promote and protect this breed. The Berger Picard was fully recognized in the herding group by the American Kennel Club on 1 July 2015. It is also in the herding group category of the Canadian Kennel Club.

The interim breed standard for the Picardy Sheepdog was approved and the breed was accepted on to the import register of the United Kingdom's Kennel Club on 1 April 2014. The breed can only be shown in Import classes and is awaiting official registration of the proposed Picardy Sheepdog Club. The Picard was first shown at Crufts in March 2016 in the Pastoral (Herding) Group.

=== Recent history ===
Berger Picards have been seen in at least three films: Daniel and the Superdogs (2004); Because of Winn-Dixie (2005); and Are We Done Yet? (2007). The producers of the American film Because of Winn-Dixie (2005) brought five Picards from Europe (three of the five actually performed: "Scott"; "Laiko"; and "Tasha"). The trainer wanted a dog that resembled the scruffy mutt on the original book's cover, but several were needed that looked alike so that production could continue smoothly, so he decided on this rare purebred dog from France. People often mistakenly think the on-screen "Winn-Dixie" was played by a mixed breed dog.

Joker, a well-known Berger Picard dog in Germany, has starred in six comedy films based on novels by Rita Falk. He played as Ludwig Eberhofer owned by Franz Eberhofer, a down-in-luck police officer in a small fictitious Bavarian town, Niederkaltenkirchen: Winterkartoffelknödel (2014), Schweinskopf al dente (2016), Grießnockerlaffäre (2017), Sauerkrautkoma (2018), Leberkäsjunkie (2019), and Kaiserschmarrndrama (2021). Joker died on 28 June 2021 after he collapsed and was rushed to the animal hospital. The autopsy revealed the splenic tumours, which were not discovered earlier during the medical examination prior to his death.

== See also ==
- List of dog breeds
