= Pastore della Lessinia e del Lagorai =

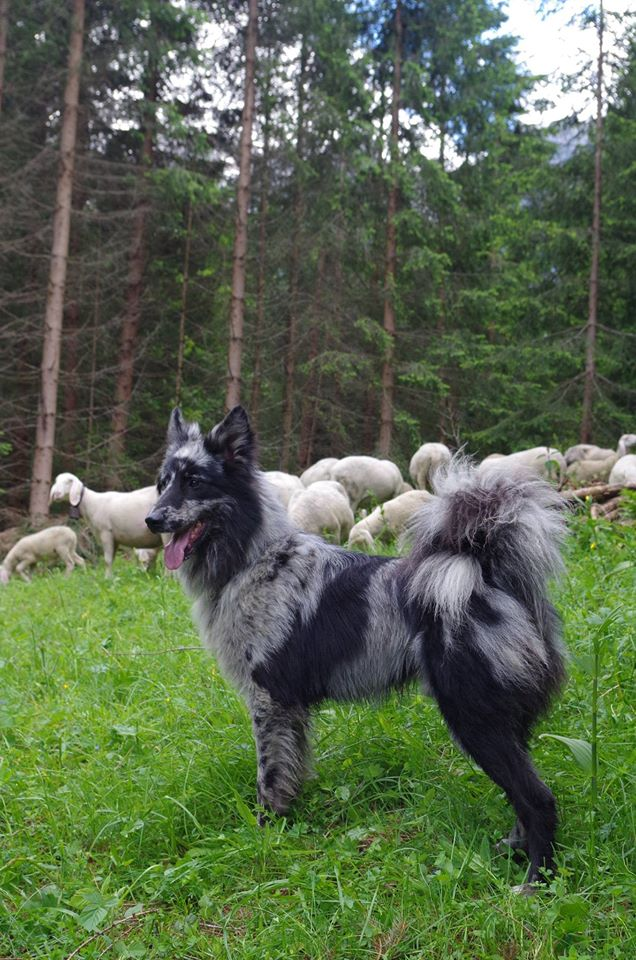
- Blue merle Pastore della Lessinia e del Lagorai
- Other names: Cane da pastore della Lessinia e del Lagorai, Pastore del Lagorai, Pastore della Lessinia, Pastore della Val d'Adige
- Origin: Italy
- Breed status: Not recognized as a breed by any major kennel club.
Traits
- Coat: Semi-long
- Color: fawn, merle, brown, black

The Pastore della Lessinia e del Lagorai (English: Lessinia and Lagorai Shepherd) is an old Italian dog breed from the northeastern region called Triveneto. It is not recognized by any major kennel organisation.

== Origin ==
In 2018, a genetic study found that just prior to 1859 a broadly distributed European herding dog had given rise to the German Shepherd Dog, the French Berger Picard, and the five Italian herding breeds: the Bergamasco Shepherd, Cane Paratore, Lupino del Gigante, Pastore d'Oropa, and the Pastore della Lessinia e del Lagorai.

The Pastore della Lessinia e del Lagorai has been traditionally used in pastoral activities, such as managing herd and driving cattle across plains of Triveneto. Still used for the same purpose, natural selection has made it a rustic and healthy working dog. There is a project going on to protect the breed from extinction and to gain an official breed status, led by Società Italiana Pastore della Lessinia e del Lagorai.

== Appearance ==
A red merle individual.

A black individual.

The Pastore della Lessinia e del Lagorai is a medium-sized, agile sheepdog of the "lupine" type. The ears are large and triangular, being either erect, semi-erect (folded) or drooping. The coat is semi-long and the undercoat is thick. Typical colours include fawn, merle (blue or red), brown, and black.

== Temperament ==
Pastore della Lessinia e del Lagorai are docile. They are also active and curious, requiring sufficient exercise. They are herding dogs, driving sheep, cattle, and horse.

== See also ==
- List of dog breeds
