= Welsh Sheepdog =

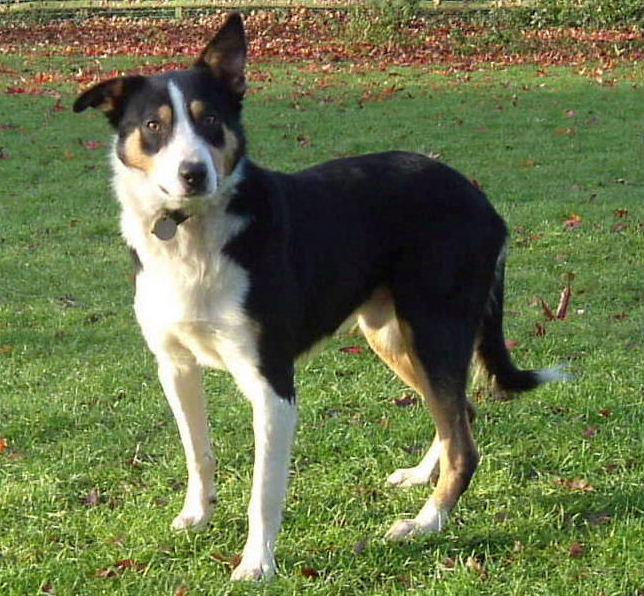
- Tricolour Welsh Sheepdog
- Origin: Wales
- Breed status: Not recognised as a breed by any major kennel club.

The Welsh Sheepdog (Welsh: Ci Defaid Cymreig, pronounced [kiː ˈdɛvaɪd kəmˈrɛɨɡ]) is a breed of herding dog of medium size from Wales.

Like other types of working dog, Welsh Sheepdogs are normally bred for their herding abilities rather than appearance, and so they are generally somewhat variable in build, colour and size. Welsh Sheepdogs are of collie type, usually black-and-white, red-and-white or tricolour, and merle markings may occur over any of these combinations. The coat may be short or fairly long, and the ears are pricked, but usually folded at the tip. They are longer in leg, broader in chest and wider in muzzle than the Border Collie. They are extremely active and intelligent, and therefore need much exercise and mental stimulation, if they are to be kept as pets.

Over many decades the Welsh Sheepdog has largely been replaced for working sheep in Wales by the Border Collie, a standardised breed. However, in more recent years, efforts have been made to maintain the indigenous Welsh Sheepdog as a distinct variety.

Welsh Sheepdogs are usually of loose-eyed action, not fixing the stock with their gaze like the strong-eyed Border Collie. They are able to work independently without necessarily being under direct human control. Welsh Sheepdogs are most often used for herding sheep, but also readily work cattle, goats, and even horses and pigs. Traditionally they were often used as droving dogs to take cattle and sheep to markets locally or elsewhere in Britain.

The Welsh Sheepdog's life span is 12–15 years.

== Terminology ==
The term Welsh Collie has been used inconsistently. It is sometimes used as an alternative name for the Welsh Sheepdog, while some modern sources use the term for a cross between a Welsh Sheepdog and a Border Collie. The Welsh Sheepdog Society states that the increasing popularity of the Border Collie following the introduction of sheepdog trials in the late nineteenth century led to extensive cross-breeding, which diluted the indigenous Welsh working type.

== History ==
At one time there existed many sheep-herding dogs peculiar to Wales; during the 18th century Welsh drovers taking sheep for sale took with them five or six sheepdogs as "herders on the narrow roads, guards against highwaymen, and providers of game on the route". These were an early type of Welsh Sheepdog, higher on the leg and more racily built than the modern day breed.

However, by the 1940s the group had decreased to two or three breeds only. The ancient pure breeds of Black-and-Tan Sheepdog and Welsh Hillman were almost extinct, and were scarcely seen working. The type best known in Wales at that time was mostly descended from the old Black-and-Tan with an infusion of working Border Collie blood.

In the 1940s the Welsh Sheepdog was still common throughout the north and central Welsh counties. In herding activities, it did not normally work low to the ground in "the showy manner sometimes seen in the work of the working [Border] Collies", as British dog fancier C. L. B. Hubbard put it in 1948. It was variable in type; approximately 18 in (46 cm) in height, but the weight ranged from the lighter built, leggier dog of North Wales at 35 lb (16 kg) to the more solid 40 to 45 lb (18 to 20 kg) dogs of Glamorganshire and Monmouthshire. There were no dog show classes for the Welsh Sheepdog as it was purely a working breed.

== Activities ==
Welsh Sheepdogs are primarily herding dogs who have a natural ability with large flocks of sheep or cattle. Some have been trained to compete in dog agility trials, obedience, rally obedience, flyball, tracking, and herding events. Herding instincts and trainability can be measured at noncompetitive herding tests. Welsh Sheepdogs can be trained to compete in stock dog trials.

== In culture ==
The 2019 film The Secret Life of Pets 2, the sequel to The Secret Life of Pets, features a character named Rooster, who is a Welsh sheepdog.

== See also ==
- List of dog breeds
- Old Welsh Grey Sheepdog
- Welsh Blue-Grey
