= Paratore =

Paratore is an Italian surname. Notable people with the surname include:

- Anthony & Joseph Paratore, American classical piano duo of Anthony Paratore (born 1944) and Joseph Paratore (born 1948)
- Ettore Paratore (1907–2000), Italian Latinist and academic
- Giuseppe Paratore (1876–1967), Italian attorney and politician
- Jim Paratore (1953–2012), American television producer
- Renato Paratore (born 1996), Italian golfer

== See also ==
- Cane Paratore, dog breed
