= Abruzzo sheepdog =

Abruzzo Sheepdog may refer to two closely related breeds of sheep dog widely used and likely originating in Abruzzo, Italy:

- Maremma-Abruzzese Sheepdog
- Abruzzese Mastiff

== See also ==
- Cane Toccatore, a sheep dog often used in Abruzzo and other regions of Italy.
