= Herding sheep =

Herding sheep may refer to:

- the activities of a human shepherd
- the activities of a herding dog

== See also ==
- sheep § Herding
