= Sardinian Shepherd Dog =

Sardinian Shepherd Dog Fonni's Dog
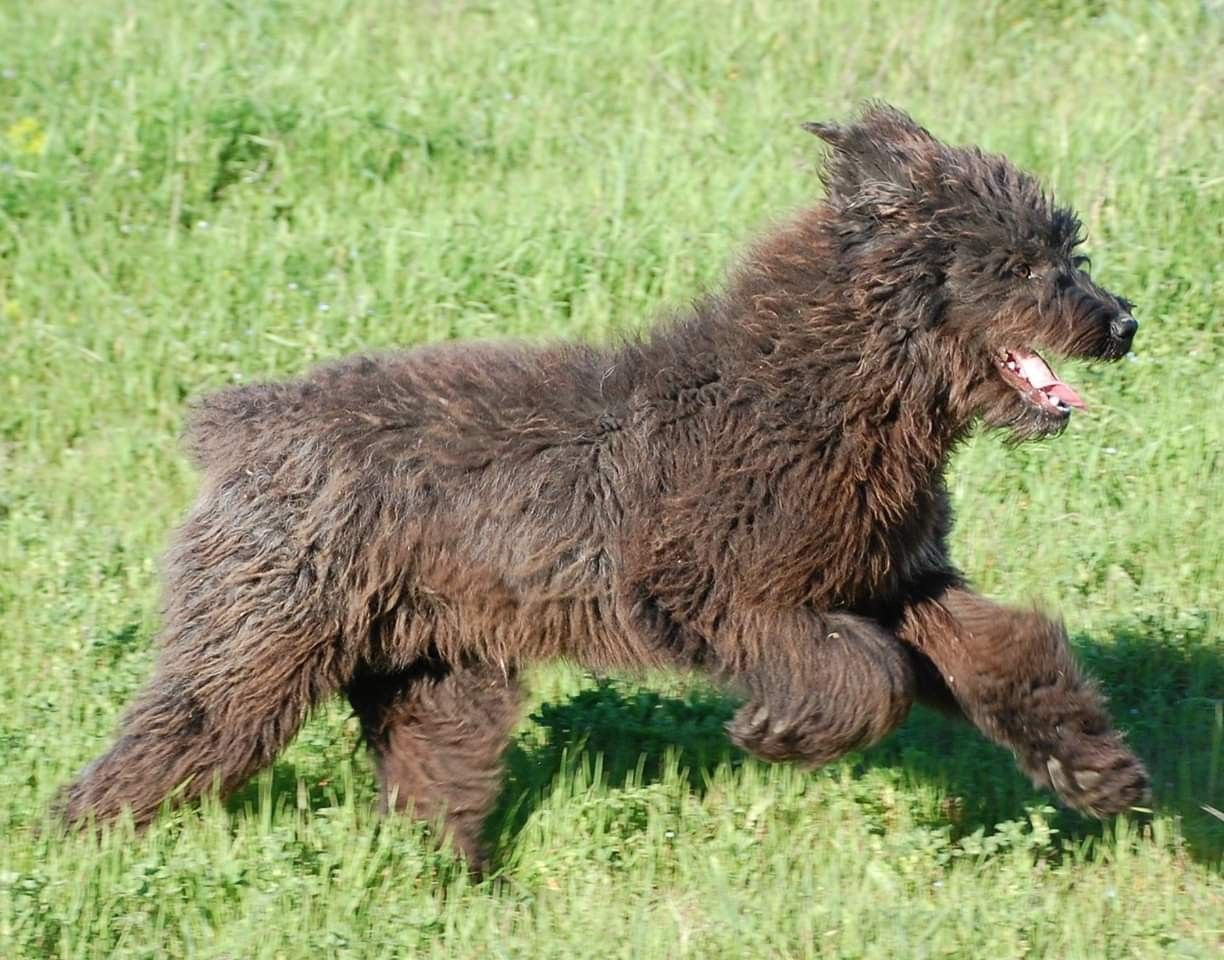
- Other names: (Pastore) fonnesu Cani sardu antigu Cane de acapiu Cani fonnesu antigu 'Ane de 'onne
- Origin: Sardinia (Italy)
- Breed status: Not recognised as a breed by any major kennel club.
Traits
| Height | Males | 56–60 cm (22–24 in) at the withers |
| | Females | 52–56 cm (20–22 in) at the withers |
| Weight | Males | 29–40 kg (64–88 lb) |
| | Females | 25–32 kg (55–71 lb) |
- Coat: long double coat with furnishings
- Color: black, ash or honey, with or without brindle markings

The Sardinian Shepherd Dog or Fonni's Dog (Sardinian: cane fonnesu or cani sardu antigu; Italian: pastore fonnese) is an ancient landrace breed of Sardinian dog used as a herding, catching, and livestock guardian dog.

Although there are depictions dating back to at least the mid-19th century, it is not recognized by the Fédération Cynologique Internationale. It has gained a recognition of the Alianza Canina Latina.

The breed, which is indigenous to the island, was founded with approximately 170 specimens gathered from rural parts of inner Sardinia. The breed is, therefore, a landrace. Because of the large number of founders and the breed's genetic variability, the breed should enjoy relative freedom from genetic inbreeding. Most of the dog breeds are derived by a very small number of founders (for example, nine dogs were used as founders of the Siberian Husky) and therefore inbreeding tends to be high, resulting in a high incidence of illness due to gene mutations.

== Appearance ==
The dog has a rough coat, which can be grey, black, brindle, brown or white. Height at the withers is about 56 to 60 cm for males, while females are a couple of centimeters shorter. A typical characteristic of the breed is the fiery expression of the eyes, whose position, unlike other dog breeds, is totally frontal, giving the dog a unique "monkey-like" appearance.

Variability observed between individuals is likely due to the lack of selective pressures. There are, however, consistently strong commonalities across dogs from different locations, including characteristics such as amber eye color and the characteristic "monkey face". The coat, irrespective of color, has a typical coarse outer layer, as well as a woolly and dense undercoat. The hair on the head and hindquarters is typically short, while the face has longer furnishings around the eyes and a beard-like length around the muzzle and chin. Male dogs have a longer and thicker coat around the neck forming a mane.

Approximately 15% of individuals are short-coated, and this is generally selected against in favor of the long-coated variety. Approximately 30% of individuals have a natural bobtail.

== See also ==
- List of dog breeds
