= Cane Paratore =

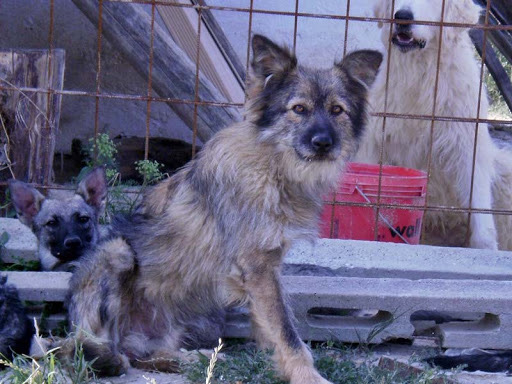
- Origin: Italy
- Breed status: Not recognised as a breed by any major kennel club.

The Cane Paratore is a breed of herding dog from Italy. The breed primarily exists in its traditional role in Abruzzo, its historical region of origin, having not gained popularity from outside dog fanciers.

== History and origins ==
The name Cane Paratore, sometimes called the Cane Toccatore, comes from an Italian dialect where "Paratore" translates to "to stand in front" or "to touch." The meaning is rooted from the breed's integral role of aiding in farming practices as a herding dog by moving livestock through less aggressive methods, such as light touches or standing in the path of livestock.

== Genetics and ancestry ==
In 2018 a genetic study found that, just prior to 1859, a broadly distributed European herding dog had given rise to the German Shepherd Dog, the French Berger Picard, and the five Italian herding breeds: the Bergamasco Shepherd, Cane Paratore, Lupino del Gigante, Pastore d'Oropa, and the Pastore della Lessinia e del Lagorai.

== Physical characteristics ==
The Cane Paratore is a robust, medium-sized breed; adult dogs typically weigh 8–10 kg and have shoulder lengths of 30–35 cm. Morphologically, it has a wolf-like appearance. It has a wide head, erect or semi-erect ears, and thick coat—which can be agouti, sable, grey brindle, leopard (merle), black, or tan with a black mask. Although short and semi-long coats are popular, the breed's coat length can vary. The Cane Paratore is a swiftly maturing, defensive species that frequently exhibits remarkable levels of adaptability and endurance in a variety of settings.

== Health and diet ==
Historically, Cane Paratore dogs have been fed a simple diet based on shepherds' meals, including bran, whey, stale bread, and meal leftovers. Although generally healthy, they are prone to conditions such as osteodystrophy, spinocerebellar ataxia, and Legg-Calve-Perthes disease. Local anecdotal evidence suggests they have a strong immune system, potentially inherited from their wolf ancestry.

== Conservation and current status ==
Today, the Cane Paratore is a rare breed that is largely unknown outside of Italy. Efforts are being made in Italy to conserve its bloodlines, particularly as its numbers have declined due to changes in farming techniques. The Fédération Cynologique Internationale (FCI) does not recognize the breed, but it is being maintained by enthusiasts in Abruzzo and nearby areas. The Cane Paratore's small gene pool has apparently resulted in occasional natural crossbreeding with wild wolves, which local conservationists consider as a way to preserve genetic diversity.

== See also ==
- List of dog breeds
