= Welsh Hillman =

Breed of dog

- Origin: Wales
- Breed status: Extinct
Traits
- Height: 64 cm (25 in)
- Colour: Fawn with black saddle, red or blue-grey, white self markings

The Welsh Hillman was an ancient landrace or type of herding dog in Wales, used for herding and droving. The variety was thought to have become extinct around 1990.

The Welsh Hillman was thought to have been descended from ancient Welsh herding dogs. It was possibly the oldest Welsh sheepdog, and may have been the descendant of the old gellgi or "Welsh wolfhounds" used around 1,000 years ago. Some sources, without any obvious evidence, suggest it was crossbred with similar dogs seen in North Africa.

It was a large but rangy dog, up to approximately 25 in (64 cm) in height, and described as "fast and fearless", with an appearance not unlike a lighter-built German Shepherd. The ears were pricked. The coat was usually of a light fawn, sandy or red-gold colour with a black saddle, a white chest, white on the legs and the tip of the tail and a blaze on the face. Blue merle dogs were also occasionally seen.

The breed was uncommon in modern times. C. L. B. Hubbard, writing in 1948, described it as "almost extinct" and "scarcely ever seen working today". The last known Welsh Hillman, "Jess", was purchased in 1974 from a hill farm near Hay-on-Wye by the author and broadcaster Jeanine McMullen, and was spayed before her owner realised her rarity.
