= Brecknock Hill Cheviot =

Breed of sheep

The Brecknock Hill Cheviot (also known as Brecon Cheviot and Sennybridge Cheviot) is a domesticated breed of sheep having its origin approximately 400 years ago from Wales. They are a result of crosses with the Welsh Mountain, the Cheviot and the Leicester breeds. This breed is primarily raised for meat. It was introduced into the US in 1838.

== Characteristics ==
Brecknock Hill Cheviot have erect ears with white face and legs and a ruff of wool behind the ears. There is no wool on the face or legs below the knee or hock. Both sexes are polled (hornless) However, the rams are occasionally horned.

Staple length is 6 to 10 cm (2.4 to 3.9 in) with a fleece weight of 1.5 to 2.5 kg (3.3 to 5.5 lb). The spinning count of the wool is 50's to 56's. The fleece has some shades of kemp but not generally red. In the UK, the wool is used mainly for tweeds and knitwear. Mature ewes weigh 45 to 85 pounds (20 to 39 kg) and mature rams 55 to 100 pounds (25 to 45 kg).
