= Patagonian Sheepdog =

Chilean breed of sheepdog

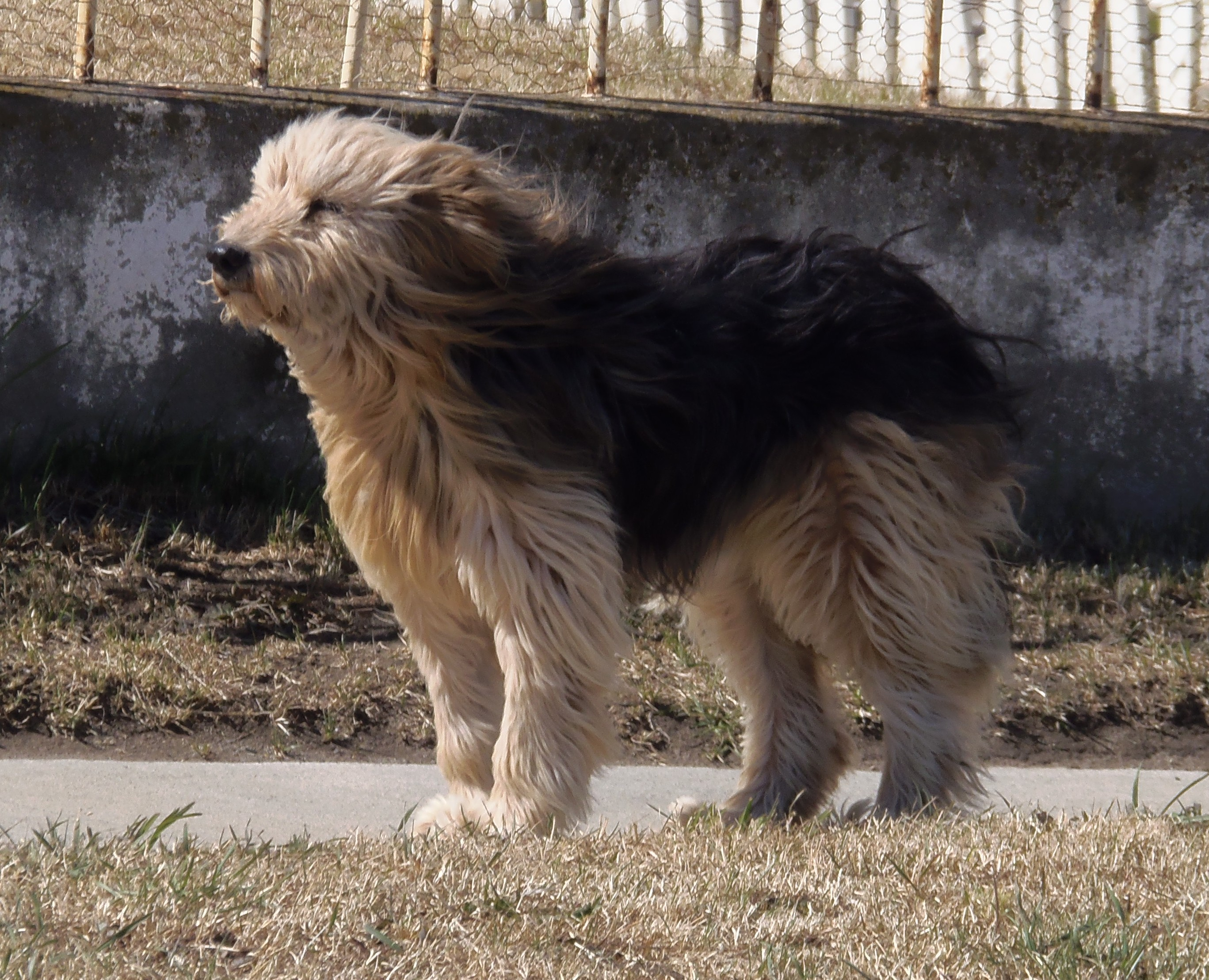
- Other names: Spanish: Ovejero Magallánico; Spanish: Barbucho
- Origin: Chile
Traits
| Height | Males | 55 cm |
| | Females | 50 cm |
| Weight | Males | 24 kg |
| | Females | 20 kg |
Kennel club standards
- Kennel Club de Chile: standard

The Patagonian Sheepdog or Spanish: Ovejero Magallánico is a Chilean breed of sheepdog. It was bred in the late nineteenth and early twentieth centuries for sheep-herding work in the Magallanes y la Antártica Chilena Region of the southern part of Chilean Patagonia. It has a long rough coat and is well adapted to the harsh climate of the area. The Kennel Club de Chile publishes a breed standard.

== History ==
The Patagonian Sheepdog was bred in the late nineteenth and early twentieth centuries for sheep-herding work in the Magallanes y la Antártica Chilena Region of the southern part of Chilean Patagonia. It derives from European working dogs brought to Chile by settlers from Europe; among its ancestors may be the Old Welsh Grey Sheepdog, which could have been brought by Welsh settlers to the Chubut Valley in Argentinian Patagonia.

== Characteristics ==
It is dog of medium stature, with a long thick coat which provides protection from the harsh weather of the Patagonian steppes and mountains.
