= Levriero Sardo =

- Other names: Cani de lèpori
- Origin: Italy
- Breed status: Not recognized as a breed by any major kennel club.
Traits
- Height: 60-70 cm
- Weight: 17-25 kg

The Levriero Sardo (Sardinian: Cani de lèpori) is a very rare breed of dog originating in Sardinia. Few specimens exist, but some Sardinian breeders are dedicated to the breed. Locally, the breed is also called vertreddru, which roughly translates to "little hunting dog."

== See also ==
- List of dog breeds
