= Llanwenog sheep =

Breed of sheep

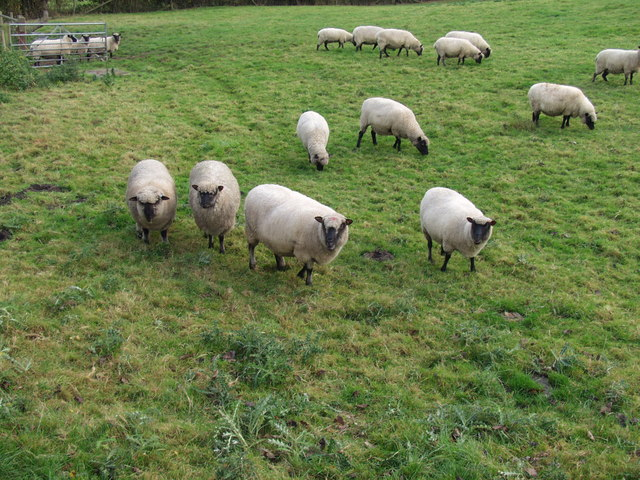
- Llanwenog and Shropshire sheep
- Country of origin: United Kingdom (Wales)
- Use: Meat

Traits
- Weight: Male: 90 kg (198 lb); Female: 55 kg (121 lb)
- Wool color: White
- Face color: Black

The Llanwenog is a breed of domestic sheep originating in Wales. It was developed in the 19th century from the (now extinct) Llanllwni, the Shropshire, Welsh Mountain, and Clun Forest breeds. The Llanwenog's native locale is the Teifi Valley, in western Wales, but it has since spread into other areas. The breed association was formed in 1957. Llanwenogs have black faces and medium-length wool. They have a docile temperament and are known for their profligacy in lambing. The breed has a very placid temperament, is easily handled, easily contained and is well suited to stress free inwintering if necessary. This has important consequences for the health of both the animal and its keeper. This breed is raised primarily for meat.

== Characteristics ==
The Llanwenog is a medium-sized breed. Rams can reach 90 kg (198 lb) or more and ewes average 55 kg (121 lb). The face and legs are black with a tuft of wool on the forehead. The wool is of high quality with a Bradford count of 56/58 and a staple length of 7.5 cm (3 in). The breed is prolific, most ewes having twins, and the lambs are fast growing, twin lambs reaching a carcase weight of 19.9 kg (43.9 lb) in 56 days.

The sheep are long-lived, docile and easy to handle with easy lambing and good mothering abilities. They are economic to feed and can be housed in winter. Ewes can be crossed with other breeds if larger carcases are required.

== Status ==
The number of purebred Llanwenogs has been decreasing over the last few years and there were estimated to be fewer than three thousand registered breeding ewes in 2015. The breed appears regularly at agricultural shows in Wales and England.

== Notes ==
- "Sheep". Watch List. Rare Breeds Survival Trust. Archived from the original on 2009-02-21.
