= Lupo Italiano =

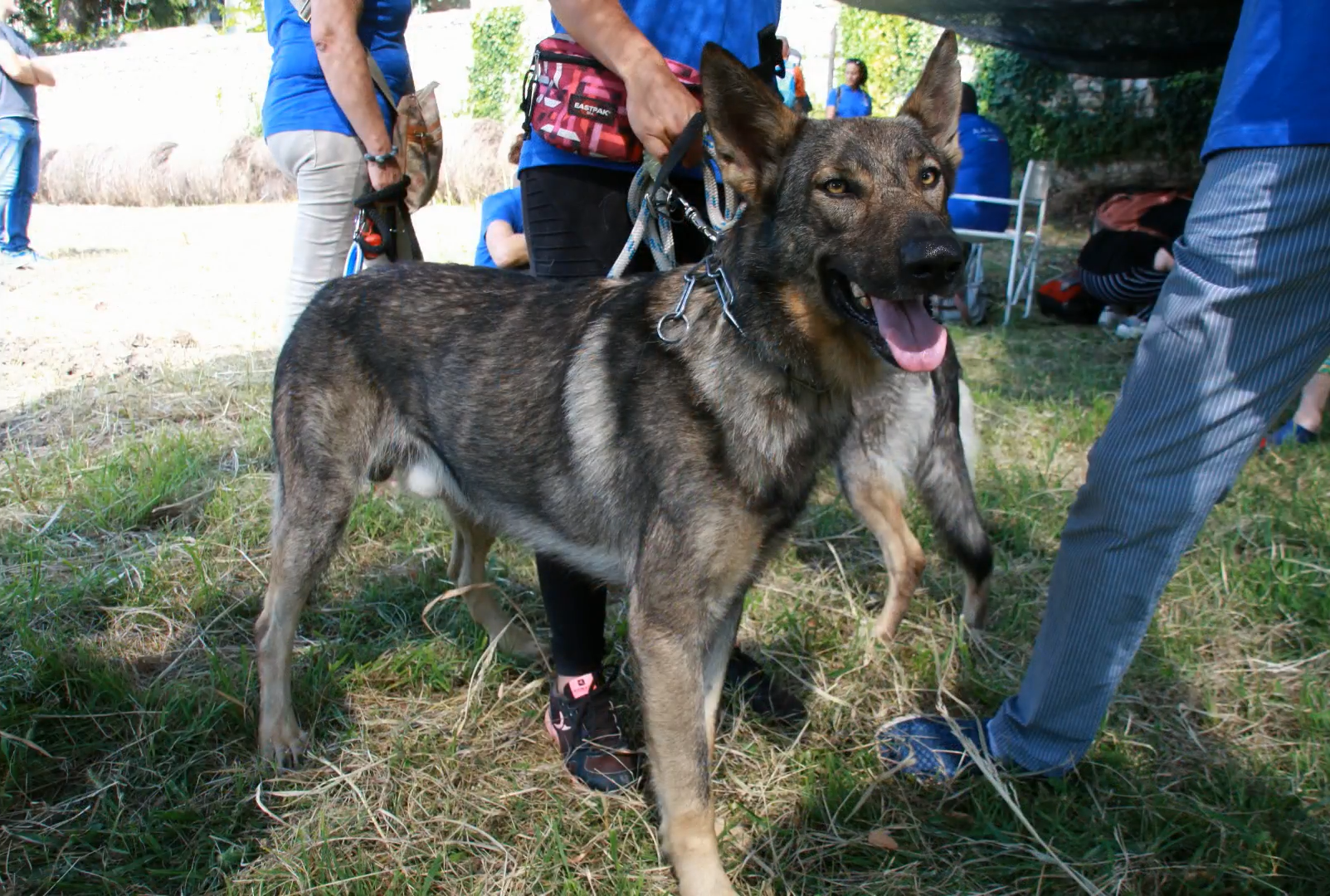
- Origin: Italy
- Breed status: Not recognised as a breed by any major kennel club.
Traits
Height	Males	60–70 cm (24–28 in)
	Females	58–65 cm (23–26 in)

The Lupo Italiano is a dog breed from Italy. According to its creator, the breed's foundation was a wolf hybrid produced from crossing a German Shepherd and an Italian wolf, though a number of genetic studies put this in doubt. As it is not recognised by the ENCI, selection and rearing of the Lupo Italiano is carried out by the Associazione degli Affidatari Allevatori del Lupo Italiano (AAALI; transl. Lupo Italiano Caregivers Association), a state-funded nonprofit organisation which prohibits its sale and only allows specimens to be leased to volunteers, police and search and rescue organisations.

According to the breed standard established by the AAALI, the Lupo Italiano has a wolf-like muzzle, powerful jaws, and pointed medium-length ears. The eyes should ideally be gold colour and oblique in shape. The adult should be 58 to 68 cm (23 to 27 inches) at the shoulder, have a robust chest and a back that is not too low. Its tread is light, even in large specimens. The breed's creator claimed that it can run at speeds of 70 km/h (43 mph). The coat is grey with shades of fulvous or beige, but the standard allows for full black or a white patch on the chest. The tail is long and pendulous when relaxed, but takes on a slight curve when raised.

== History ==
According to the breed's creator, former banker Mario Messi, the Lupo Italiano originated in 1966 after he was given a wolf hybrid born from a female Italian wolf, captured in the Province of Rieti by a hunter in his employ, and a male German Shepherd specialised in rescue operations. The hybrid, named "Zorro", was then mated to German Shepherds and their resulting female offspring. The specimens were originally kept in a 19th century villa in Cumiana until Messi was ordered to relocate by the mayor of the comune after residents of Borgata Porta complained about the dogs' howls. The dogs were moved to a modern facility capable of housing 200 specimens, and included enclosures modeled after the wolf's natural habitat.

In 1980, Messi founded the Associazione Selezione Originale di Lupi Italiani (ASOLI; transl. Original Association for the Selection of Lupo Italianos), a nonprofit organisation dedicated to preserving the breed's purity. The organisation was funded by volunteer contributions, and Messi declared that the Lupo Italiano could only be leased for public utility. Official recognition of the Lupo Italiano by the ENCI was slated for 4 July 1982 during the Italian dog breed expo, but this did not materialise due to Messi's refusal to commercialise the breed.

In February 1984, the experimental phase of the breeding project was declared concluded, with the Lupo Italiano's phenotype having been stabilised. Nevertheless, Messi expressed concern that he would have to close the breeding facility, despite the patronage of the Ministry of Public Education and the Ministry of Ecology in Piedmont. The next year, lack of funds made providing food and vaccines to the dogs difficult, resulting in the deaths of several pups from disease and malnutrition. In 1987, despite being warned of the possible euthanisation of all 200 dogs in the facility, Messi continued to oppose selling them, even to cover costs.

On 13 July 1987, president Francesco Cossiga signed a decree recognising the ASOLI. The Official Registry of the Lupo Italiano was established later by Filippo Maria Pandolfi, which granted the ASOLI exclusive control over the breed's care and breeding. In 1989, the ASOLI was renamed Ente per la Tutela del Lupo Italiano (ETLI; transl. Lupo Italiano Management Institution) and private ownership of the Lupo Italiano was prohibited by presidential decree. Nevertheless, the breeding facility's financial situation continued to be precarious, with Messi launching an appeal for further funding.

In 1990, it was reported that the Lupo Italianos in the Cumiana facility were in poor health due to lack of food, medical treatment and flooding of their enclosures. Two years later, the facility was seized after local health authorities revealed the risk of outbreaks of leptospirosis, piroplasmosis, leishmaniasis and dirofilariasis, and an indictment was requested for lack of hygiene and mistreatment of the dogs in the facility.

In 2000, citing a continued lack of funding, Messi implied that he would be forced to transfer ETLI headquarters abroad. The next year, with support from Stefania Belmondo, Messi petitioned to have the Lupo Italiano as the official mascot of the 2006 Winter Olympics. In 2004, the breed was nominated the official assistance dog of the games.

In 2007, it was reported that the Cumiana facility no longer had Lupo Italianos, having become occupied by dogs of different breeds. Minister of Agricultural, Food and Forestry Policies Luca Zaia noted that the ETLI was deeply in debt and no longer breeding or training its dogs, and criticised Messi's "barely democratic" management policies. In May 2010, the ETLI was liquidated by the Turin prefecture and management of the breed was assigned to the Associazione degli Affidatari Allevatori del Lupo Italiano (AAALI; transl. Lupo Italiano Caregivers Association).

== Genetics ==
Article 2 of the breed standard published by the AAALI declares the Lupo Italiano to be descended from a now extinct population of wolf from Alto Lazio which was "significantly different from other types". In 1982, Mario Messi described the Lupo Italiano as 62.5% German Shepherd and 37.5% Italian wolf. In a 2002 interview, he declared that the breed was "more wolf than dog: 60% wolf and 40% dog". The AAALI gives an average percentage of wolf content at around 30-35%.

In 2007, ecologists backed by the Lega Anti Vivisezione (LAV; transl. Anti-Vivisection League) commissioned the Turin chamber of commerce to start an investigation into the genetic profile of the Lupo Italiano. The resulting analyses indicated that there was no wolf content in the breed, prompting the LAV to request the Prodi administration to suspend all funds to the ETLI. Apart from the breed's lack of wolf content, the regional councillor of the ecologists cited Messi's exclusive access to the breed's official registry, which apparently contained irregularities on the number of matings and births.

In 2017, a further genetic study undertaken by the universities of Milan, Messina, Sassari and Bologna, in collaboration with the Human Genome Project, analysed 142,840 single-nucleotide polymorphisms of 1,609 canids, among which were seven Italian wolves and 24 samples of Lupo Italiano provided by the AAALI. Although the study confirmed that the Lupo Italiano is closely related to the German Shepherd, it could not find any significant haplotype sharing between it and the Italian wolf.

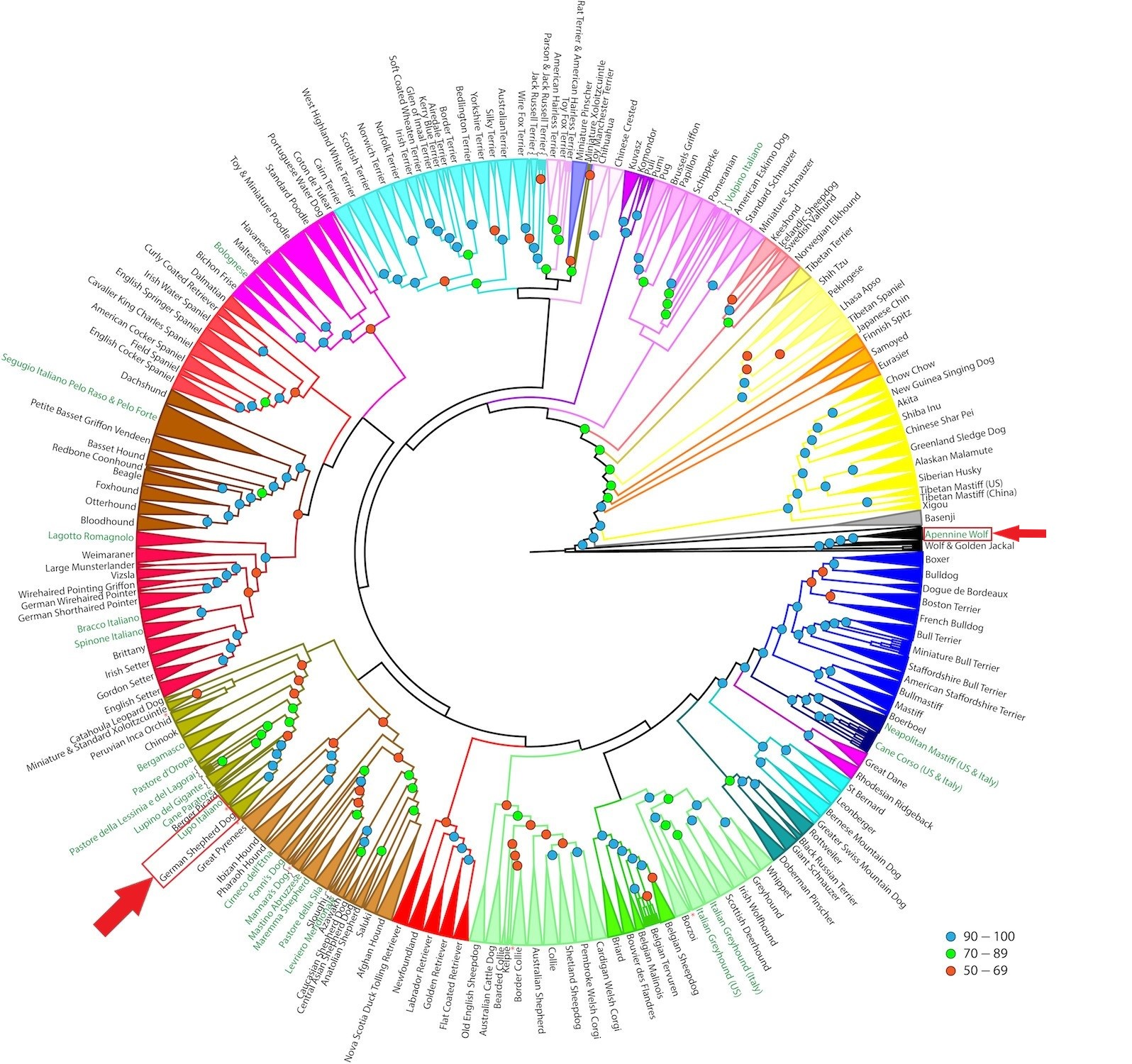
Fig. a

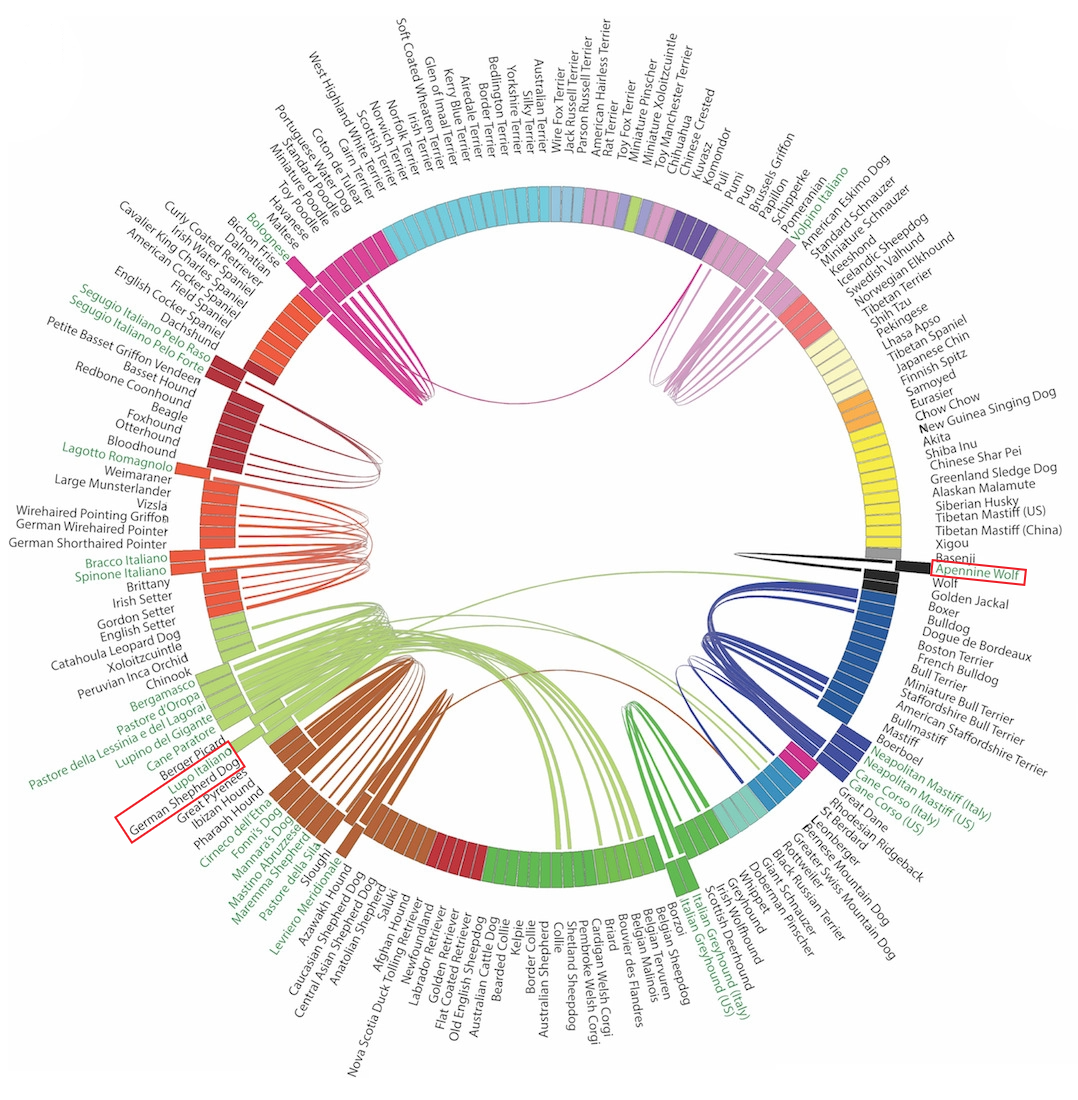
Fig. b
Phylogenetic dendrograms illustrating genetic distance (a) and haplotype sharing (b) between Italian and non-Italian dog breeds and the Italian wolf, with the Lupo Italiano, the German Shepherd and the Italian wolf highlighted
