= Clun Forest sheep =

British breed of sheep

Clun Forest Sheep
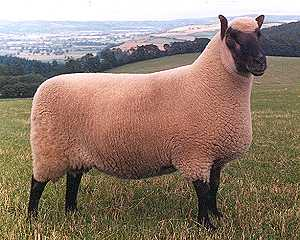
- Ram of the Clun Forest breed
- Conservation status: FAO (2007): not at risk
- Country of origin: United Kingdom
- Use: meat, milk, wool

Traits
- Weight: Male: 91 kg; Female: 68 kg
- Wool colour: white
- Face colour: dark brown
- Horn status: not horned

The Clun Forest is a breed of domestic sheep originating from the area surrounding the Clun Forest in Shropshire, England. Similar to many of the British breeds of upland sheep, Clun Forest are hardy, adaptable, good foragers, and are long–lived. With sleek heads and wide pelvic structures, Clun Forest ewes lamb easily. The breed has a short to medium–length wool and dark brown faces. They are a multi–purpose animal, kept for meat, wool, and milk. Like other dark faced sheep, Clun produce quality lamb and mutton. However, in contrast to more common meat breeds such as Suffolks, their wool is free of undesirable black fibres and kemp, and is suitable for handspinning. The breed's alert and stylish appearance, together with its reputation for hardiness and fecundity have made it popular with hobby farmers and large commercial flock owners alike. The Official Clun Sheep Breeders Society Show & Sale for males and females is held annually in early September at Ludlow livestock market by McCartneys.

== History ==
The breed takes its name from the old town of Clun and the surrounding forests in the southwest corner of Shropshire, England. One of the first mentions of the breed is in 1803 when the Rev. Joseph Plymley, writing on the agriculture of Shropshire for the Board of Agriculture, quoted from a previous report dealing with these forest sheep. He stated that upon the hills nearer Wales the flocks were without horns and had white faces.

In 1837 Youatt confirms this, stating that the Clun Forest sheep were definitely white-faced and hornless. However, he also mentions that the breed was fast changing their appearance. This was caused by the crossing of other local breeds such as the Longmynd, Radnor & Shropshire (sheep), which was resulting in the darker colouring of the head.

In 1892, W.J.Malden, writing in the Royal Agricultural Journal, stated that, ‘A well bred Clun ram, as it now stands, is an imposing animal, one which demands admiration for all those who possess an eye to a sheep’.

In 1925 the Clun Forest Sheep Breeders Society was formed in Great Britain ‘to secure the purity of lineage and fixity of type’ and also to promote the virtues of the breed throughout the sheep industry. Gradually, flocks began to establish pedigree status and after the hiatus of the Second World War, the Clun entered its Golden Age, a period which extended from the mid-forties to the seventies. It is during this period that the Clun became the third most numerous purebred in Britain. During the mid-1950s at the annual four-day sales at Craven Arms some 75,000 purebred ewes were sold, and there were other sales centres. Some flocks were very large, and it is claimed that several flocks were selling over a thousand purebred sheep a year. The breeders had a number of markets, for not only did they ship large numbers of ewes to the commercial farms of eastern England, but Clun flocks both pedigreed and commercial were being established on grassland in many parts of the country and also in Scotland and Ireland.

The Clun arrived in North America in 1970 when Tony Turner imported two rams and thirty-nine ewes, to be followed by one further ram to Nova Scotia. In 1974 the North American Clun Forest Association was founded in Harrisburg, Pennsylvania. Following the original 1970 importation, Angus Rouse of Nova Scotia undertook two further importations in the late 1970s and mid-1980s. Since then US and Canadian borders have been closed to live sheep imports, but semen from some of the top Clun rams in the UK and the Netherlands have been imported in the mid-2000s.

In recent years the Clun Forest sheep has declined in numbers in its native Britain, but interest in the breed has grown steadily in North American and in the Netherlands. Since a few years also interest in The Czech Republic has grown after imports from France, The Netherlands and England.

== Breed characteristics ==
A Clun Forest Ewe

The Clun Forest sheep is a medium-sized dark faced sheep that is known for its hardiness, long life, fertility and good mothering abilities. A Clun ewe will usually produce twins which will grow very quickly due to the high butterfat content of her milk.

The most striking feature of the Clun is the face, which is a rich dark colour, rather narrow, and free from wool except for a woolen top knot. The ears are held upright, giving the sheep a very alert and lively appearance. The sheep's powerful build is emphasised by its strong muscular neck and a long broad back. Legs below the hock should be as free from wool as possible, while the fleece itself should be uniform in staple length, colour and texture from head to tail.

=== Meat ===
Clun Forest sheep are very well adapted to grass-fed farming. Lambs consistently reach a market weight of 100 lbs. (45 kg) at seven to eight months on grass alone. The meat is lean and of mild flavour.

=== Wool ===
Clun Forest fleeces are of moderate weight (six to eight pounds) and staple (four inches) and are very consistent from neck to britch. Clun fleeces are free of any black or kempy fibres and hold an average spinning count of 58.

=== Milk ===
Because Clun Forest ewes produce some of the highest butterfat in their milk of any sheep breed, Cluns are often crossed with dairy sheep such as the East Friesian to impart extra richness in sheep cheeses, and to provide dairy flocks with larger market lambs.

== Gallery ==
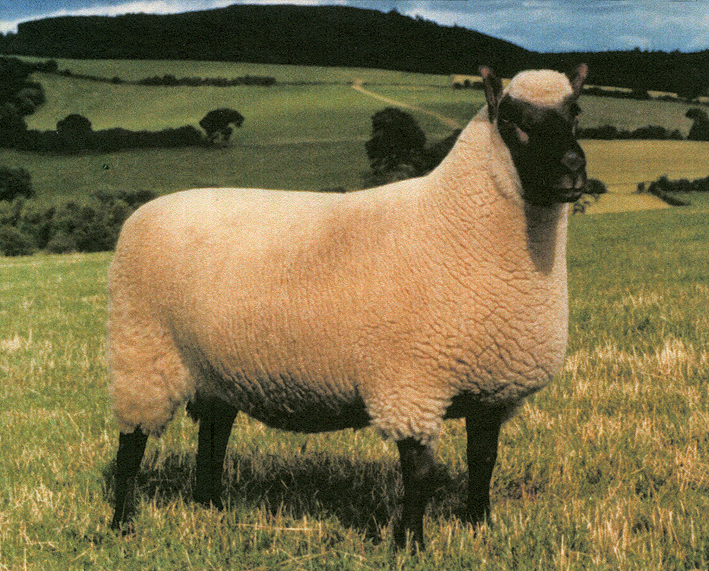
1980 UK Clun Ram of the Year

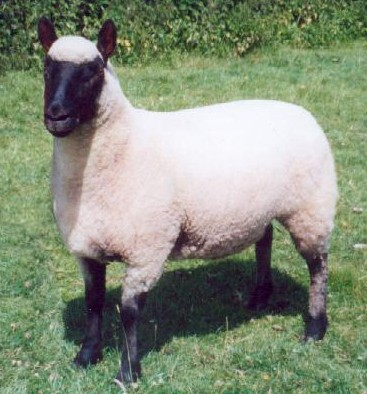
2000 UK Clun Ewe of the Year Court-Llacca 00.01

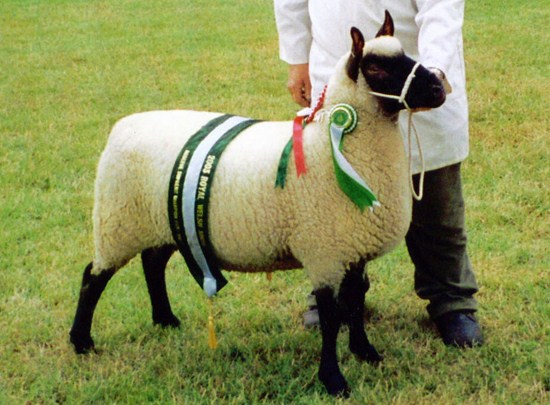
2003 UK Clun Ewe of the Year

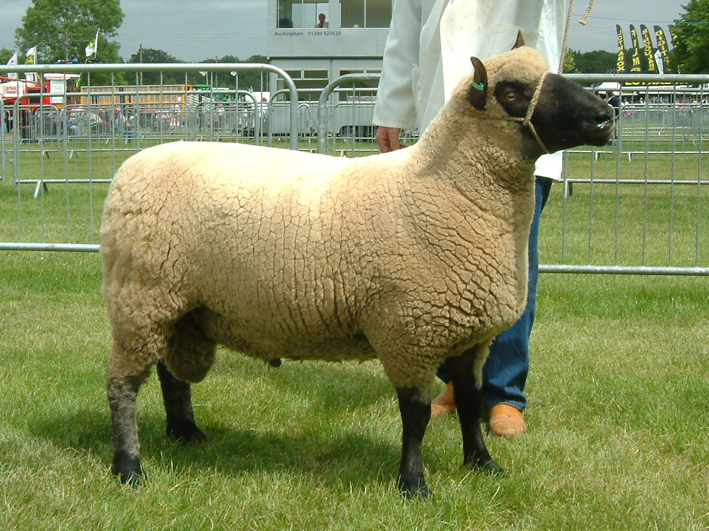
2006 UK Clun Ram of the Year

UK Clun ewes imported to the Netherlands

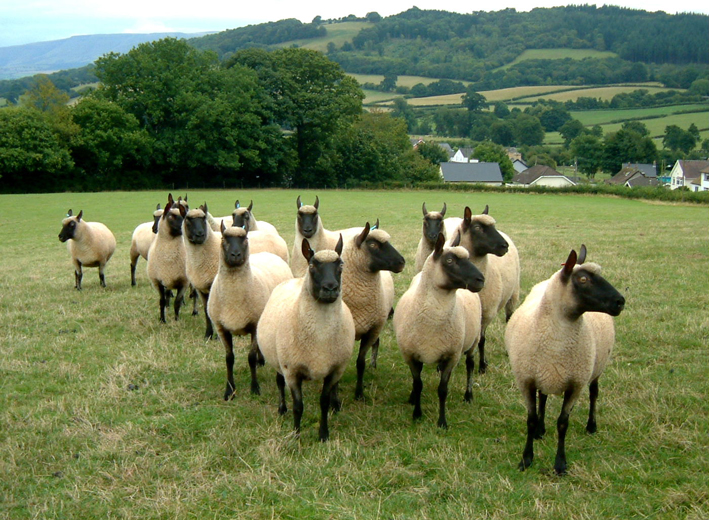
Cluns from the Court Llacca Flock in Wales

One-year-old rams from the Guifron Flock in England

== See also ==
- Clun, a town in Shropshire
- sheep's milk cheeses
