= Hill Radnor =

Breed of sheep

- Conservation status: Vulnerable
- Country of origin: United Kingdom
- Distribution: Powys, Herefordshire, Monmouthshire
- Type: Upland
- Use: Meat

Traits
- Wool color: White
- Face color: Light brown
- Horn status: Ewes are polled (hornless), rams are horned

The Hill Radnor is a breed of domestic sheep originating in the United Kingdom. Classified as one of the mountain (or upland) breeds, it is most common from Powys down to southwest Herefordshire and Monmouthshire. The Hill Radnor has a dense white fleece, with a light brown face and legs. Ewes are polled and rams are horned. It is hardy and forages well, like many hill breeds. Hill Radnor ewes have good maternal instincts, and are sometimes crossed with lowland rams to yield market lambs or mules. Lambing percentages vary under different conditions but the breed can easily average around 155%. The breed is listed as "vulnerable" by the Rare Breeds Survival Trust of the U.K.
