= Old Welsh Grey Sheepdog =

Extinct breed of dog

Welsh Grey
- Other names: Old Welsh Grey
- Origin: Wales
- Breed status: Extinct
Traits
- Coat: Shaggy, long-haired

The Welsh Grey or Old Welsh Grey was a breed of sheepdog native to Wales. It is likely now extinct.

== Description ==
Welsh Greys were shaggy, long-haired dogs, similar in appearance to working strains of the Scottish Bearded Collie or to the ancestors of the Old English Sheepdog, and the breeds probably have a common heritage.

== As a working dog ==
Like the Bearded Collie, the Welsh Grey worked in a "loose-eyed", noisy manner very different from the Border and other collie types, with a distinctive short bark. As well as being used by shepherds, the breed was also popular with the drovers who took livestock to England.

== History ==
All types of Welsh sheepdog declined in numbers from the early 20th century due to the increasing use of the Border Collie for herding. Dogs of the Welsh Grey breed were still found on Welsh hill farms in the upper Towy valley as late as the 1980s, but the breed is likely now extinct.

Specimens of the Welsh Grey are thought to have accompanied Welsh settlers to Patagonia and the Patagonian Sheepdog is in part a descendant from this breed.
