= Herding dog =

Type of dog used for herding

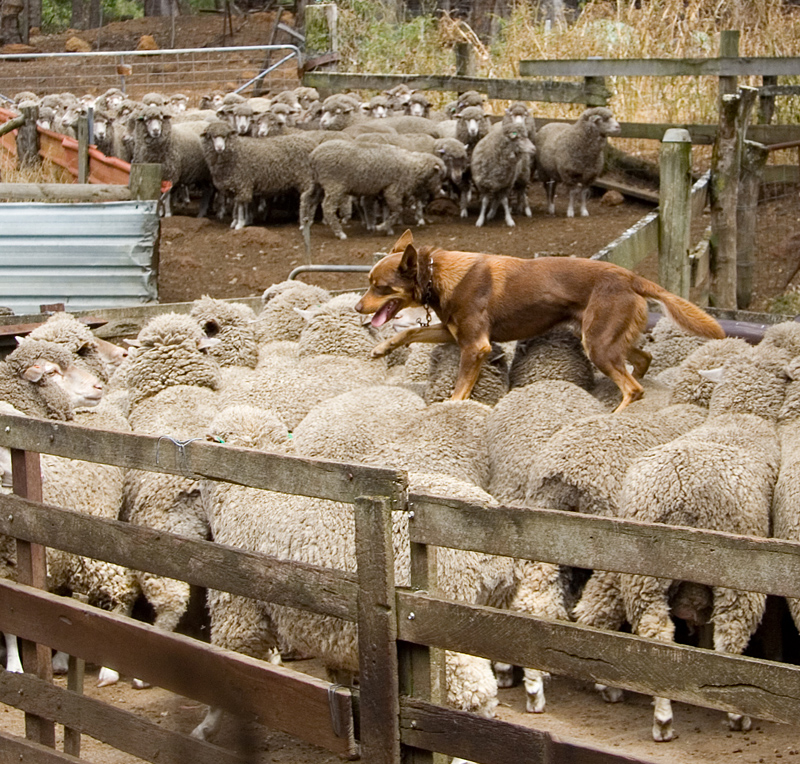
An Australian Kelpie backing sheep.

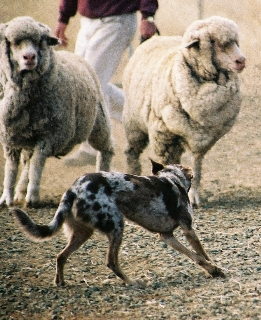
A Koolie working with sheep.

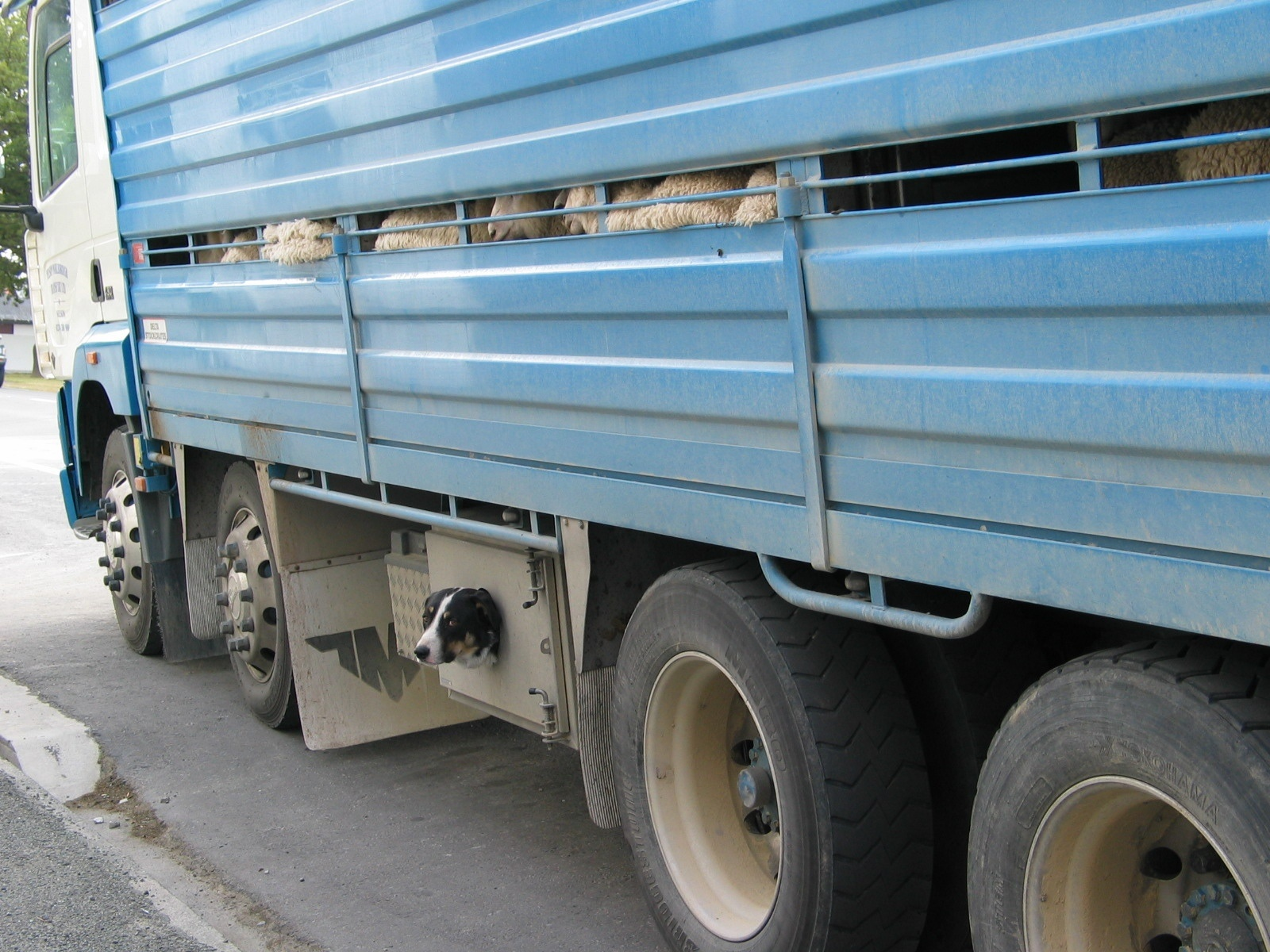
Sheepdog transported with livestock in Fairlie, New Zealand

A herding dog, also known as a stock dog or working dog, is a type of dog that either has been trained in herding livestock or belongs to one of the breeds that were developed for herding. A dog specifically trained to herd sheep is known as a sheep dog or shepherd dog, and one trained to herd cattle is known as a cattle dog or cow dog.

== History ==
The creation of herding dog breeds is associated with the development of sheep, goat and cattle breeding. Domestication of sheep and goats began in the 8th–7th millennium BC. Originally, this process began in Western Asia, in the territory of modern Iran and Iraq. Shepherding was a difficult task: primitive herders did not have horses and moved their animals for grazing on foot as horses and donkeys were not yet fully domesticated or obedient enough. Dogs that previously helped humans in hunting became assistants in livestock maintenance. The main task for dogs in the early stages of herding was protecting herds from a variety of wild predators, which were very numerous.

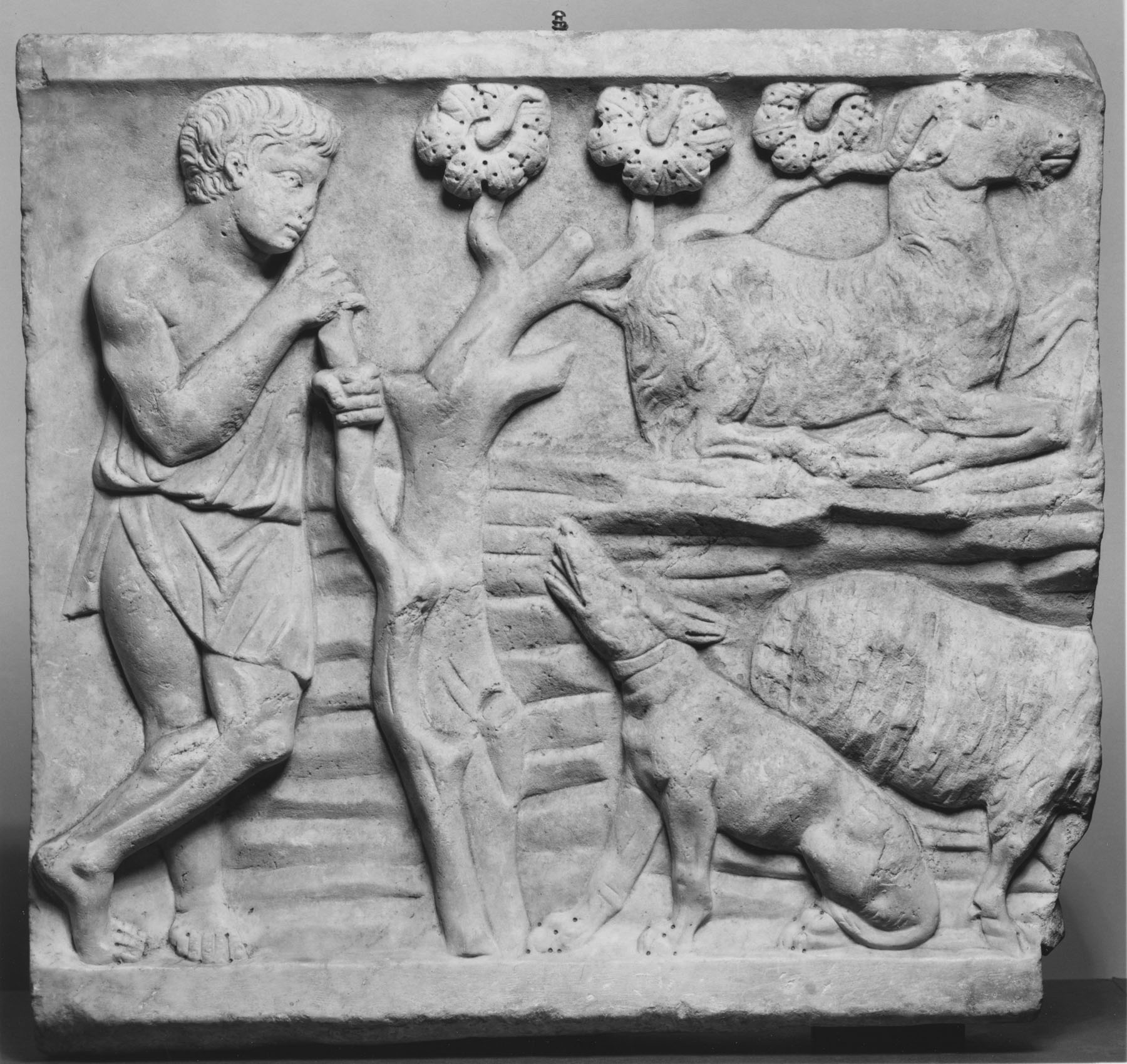
Roman relief of a herdsman

This function predetermined herding dogs' characteristics: they had to be strong, vicious, courageous, decisive, able to stand alone against a large predator and, most importantly, ready to defend their herd. The history of the ancestors of herding dogs can be traced back to six thousand years ago, archaeological findings of the joint remains of sheep and dogs date back to 3685 BC. The place of their origin is considered to be the territories of modern Turkey, Iraq and Syria.

In the writings of Cato the Elder and Varro, images of dogs are found in works of art created more than two thousand years ago. These dogs were used not only to guard herds, but also for military purposes.

From the regions of Western Asia, herding spread to the west and north, followed by an increase in the number of domestic animals. On the territory of Europe, the progenitors of herding dogs appeared in the 6th to 7th centuries BC. According to archaeological research, cattle breeding and agriculture spread across Europe in different ways: along the Danube and Rhine rivers to the territory of modern Germany, northern France and the Netherlands, through the Mediterranean Sea to the Alps, up the Rhone to central and southwestern France.

There is evidence that the Chiribaya culture of Peru and Chile bred and used a species of herding dog. Chiribaya dogs were believed to be used for herding llamas, and were valued highly enough by the Chiribaya to be buried in their own graves; often, the burial sites also included blankets or food.

The development of agriculture, increasing the number of settlements and foundation of cities led to a decrease in the number of predators. After the extinction of large predators in most of Europe and Great Britain, with the massive spread of sheep breeding and with an increase in the share of cultivated and populated land, the main task of herding dogs was to protect crops, private and protected areas from harm during grazing and moving herds. Shepherd dogs were more suitable for this work than larger and stronger breeds, being medium-sized and mobile. Such dogs managed small and large livestock, as well as domestic birds. In addition to the Central European type of shepherd, another type of dog has emerged, often with thick hair, more suitable for colder areas. These dogs have shown not only the ability to manage the herd, but also to protect it. With the spread of reindeer breeding among the northern peoples, hunting spitz-like dogs were "retrained" into shepherds.

Most breeds of Central European shepherd dogs – with erect ears and short hair on the head, similar to wolves, were mainly formed in the 16th to 17th centuries. The breeds of curly-haired dogs of the Northern European type were formed later.

== Terminology ==
In Australia, New Zealand and the United States, herding dogs are known as working dogs irrespective of their breeding. Some herding breeds work well with any kind of animals; others have been bred for generations to work with specific kinds of animals and have developed physical characteristics or styles of working that enhance their ability to handle these animals. Commonly mustered animals include cattle, sheep, goats and reindeer, although it is not unusual for poultry to be handled by dogs.

The term "herding dog" is sometimes erroneously used to describe livestock guardian dogs, whose primary function is to guard flocks and herds from predation and theft, and they lack the herding instinct. Although herding dogs may guard flocks their primary purpose is to move them; both herding dogs and livestock guardian dogs may be called "sheep dogs".

In general terms, when categorizing dog breeds, herding dogs are considered a subcategory of working dogs, but for conformation shows they usually form a separate group.

Australia has the world's largest cattle stations and sheep stations and some of the best-known herding dogs, such as the Koolie, Kelpie, Red and Blue Heelers are bred and found there.

== Physical characteristics ==
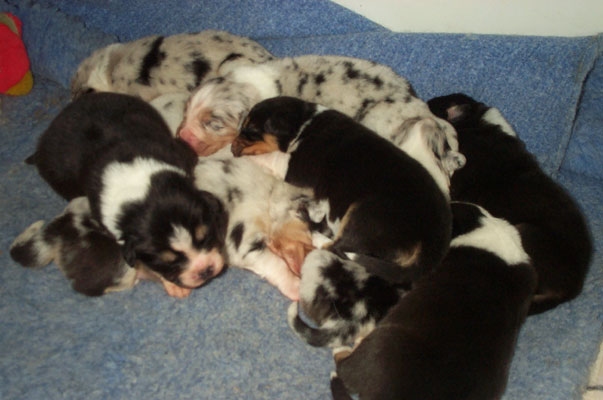
A litter of Australian Shepherd puppies featuring different coat colors, including Blue Merle and Black Tricolor variations.

Regardless of the conditions in which herding dogs work and what function they perform, they all have a number of common characteristics. Herding dogs are strong and have a lot of stamina. Their paws are well protected from thorns and sharp stones: toes are compressed into a tight lump, paw pads are thick, claws are strong. The coat has structure and density to protect from getting wet and temperature extremes common in the region of the breed origin. All herding dogs have excellent eyesight and hearing. Cattle dog colors are varied and depend on local breeders' preferences, but all herding dogs should have well-pigmented eyelids, lips, nose and paw pads, because pink skin is too delicate and prone to wounds and sunburn.

Many dog breeds are selectively bred for physical traits that will benefit them in their environments. Australian Cattle Dogs, for example, come in two main colors, Blue and Red. These two main coat colors feature variations, including Speckle and Mottle. Border Collies feature similar patterns to Australian Shepherds, such as Black and White, Lilac, Merle, and Tricolor variations. The Patagonian Sheepdog's medium or long length coat comes in an abundance of colors, allowing it to not only be protected against the cold and possibly snow, but also camouflaged against the rocky Magallanes region. Most herding dog breeds are medium to large in weight, and are bred to be muscular, lean, and agile to perform their duties.

== Herding behavior ==
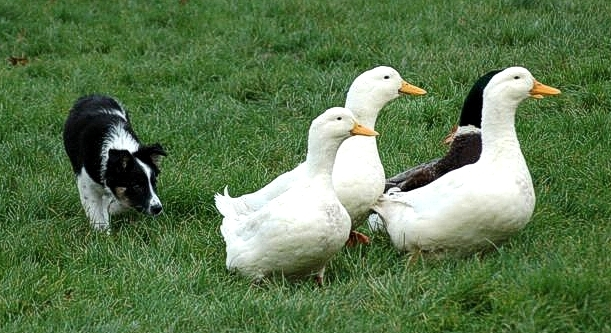
A nine-week-old Border Collie directing ducks.

All herding behavior is modified predatory behavior. Through selective breeding, humans have been able to minimize the dog's natural inclination to treat cattle and sheep as prey while simultaneously maintaining the dog's hunting skills, thereby creating an effective herding dog.

Dogs can work other animals in a variety of ways. Some breeds, such as the Australian Cattle Dog, typically nip at the heels of animals (for this reason they are called heelers) and the Cardigan and Pembroke Welsh Corgis were historically used in a similar fashion in the cattle droves that moved cattle from Wales to the Smithfield Meat Market in London but are rarely used for herding today.

Other breeds, notably the Border Collie, get in front of the animals and use what is called strong eye to stare down the animals; they are known as headers. The headers or fetching dogs keep livestock in a group. They consistently go to the front or head of the animals to turn or stop the animal's movement. The heelers or driving dogs keep pushing the animals forward. Typically, they stay behind the herd. The Australian Kelpie and Australian Koolie use both these methods and also run along the backs of sheep so are said to head, heel, and back. Other types such as the Australian Shepherd, English Shepherd and Welsh Sheepdog are moderate to loose eyed, working more independently. The New Zealand Huntaway uses its loud, deep bark to muster mobs of sheep. Belgian Malinois, German Shepherd Dogs and Briards are historically tending dogs, who act as a "living fence", guiding large flocks of sheep to graze, while preventing them from eating valuable crops and wandering onto roads.

Herding instincts and trainability can be measured when introducing a dog to livestock or at noncompetitive herding tests. Individuals exhibiting basic herding instincts can be trained to compete in herding trials.

== Herding dog breeds ==
Many parts of the world have specific herding dogs that have been bred for their specific environment or job. Despite the shift of many becoming family dogs, they still maintain these characteristic traits.

The Finnish Lapphund originated in Lapland, Finland, with the earliest records being in 7000 BC. These dogs specializes in herding reindeer, and tend to have a thick, double coat to help combat the cold winters and snow.

Further East, the Samoyed originated and was aptly named after the Asian semi-nomadic residents who relied on these dogs for daily life. The Samoyed breed evolved alongside the Samoyede lifestyle; they went from hunting wild reindeer, to herding and helping domesticate reindeer. On top of their fur being excellent insulation and camouflage in their native homeland of Siberia, the undercoat was frequently spun into wool by the Samoyede people and used for clothes.

In Chile, the rare Patagonian Sheepdog is used frequently to herd sheep and other cattle farming. The Patagonian Sheepdog was selectively bred in the 1900s for sheep herding, with a major contributor being the Old Welsh Grey.

In Europe, there are many trademark herding dog breeds. Specifically, there are four recognized Belgian shepherds. There is the Belgian Tervuren, Sheepdog, Laekenois and the notable Belgian Malinois, a type of Belgian Shepherd. The Belgian Malinois was originally bred for a versatile, dependable farm companion. This included herding various livestock, such as goat, sheep, and even ducks. In more recent times, the Belgian Malinois is more commonly used in police and rescue work around the world.

The Bergamasco Sheepdog, also known as the Bergamasco Shepherd, originated within the mountainous town of Bergamo, Italy. It is notorious for being one of few dog breeds with tight "flock" coats. This trademark flocking is selected for to protect against climate and predators while herding sheep within the steep Alps.

The Shetland Sheepdog originated in Shetland, in the Northern Isles of Scotland. Originally, they were used for herding sheep and horses. They have since become a common family and working dog within the United States, as well as popular agility competitors.

The Pembroke Welsh Corgi originated in the year 1107, when Henry I of England invited Flemish weavers to South Wales to work. The Corgi has served many purposes throughout history. Herding cattle, such as sheep and cow, are where this breed shines; the Corgi breed notably bite at heels of cattle to herd, and due to short stature, hold an advantage of avoiding the reactive kicks.

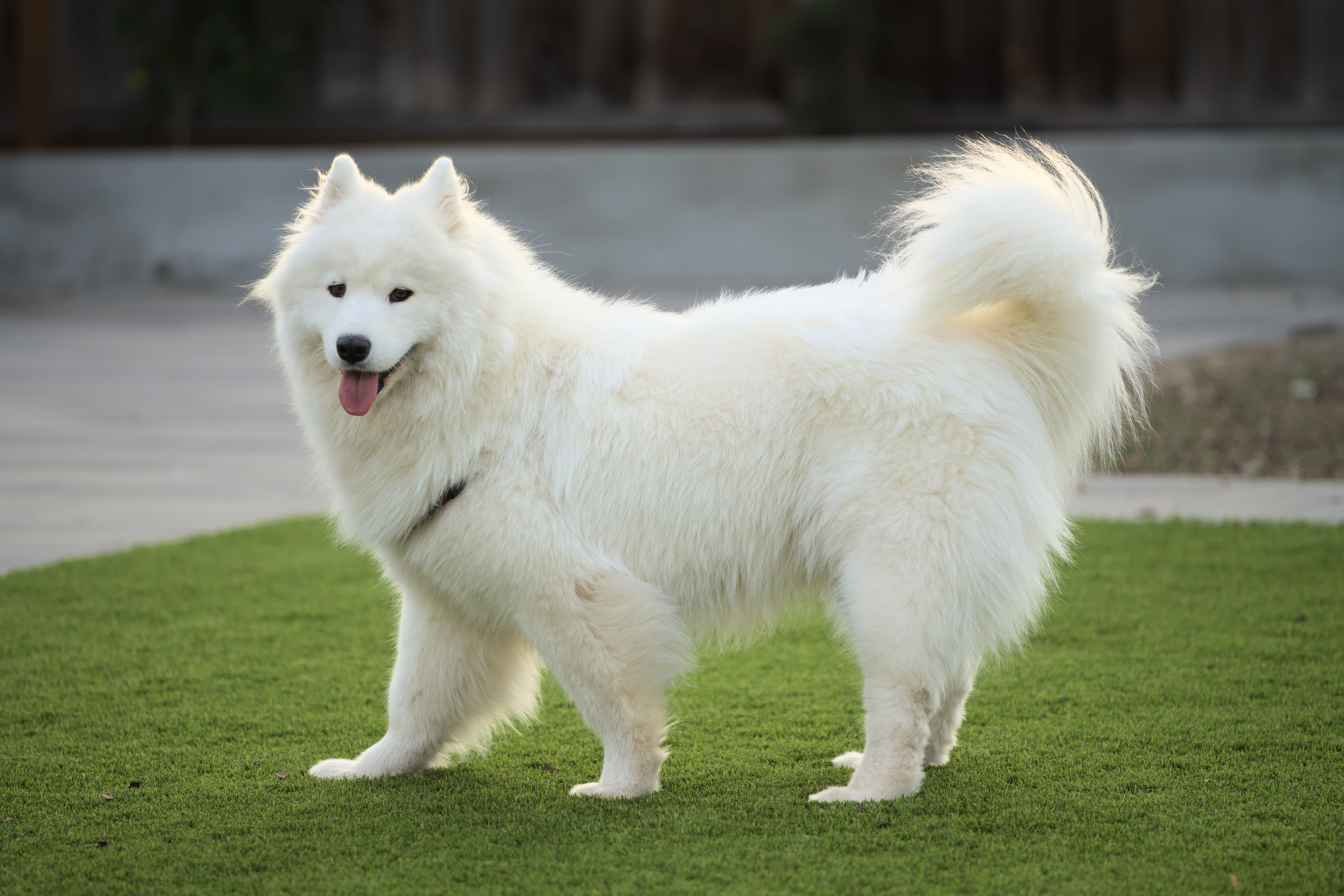
A Samoyed

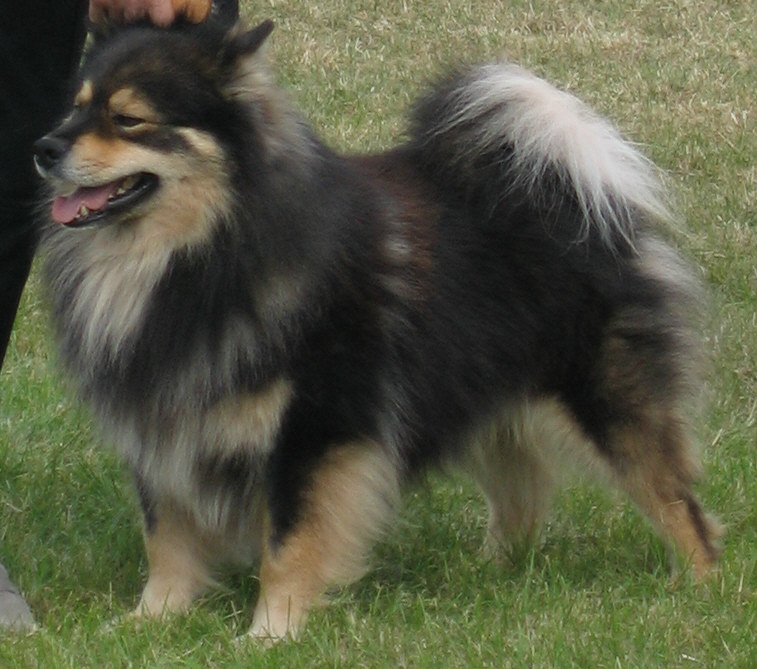
Finnish Lapphund

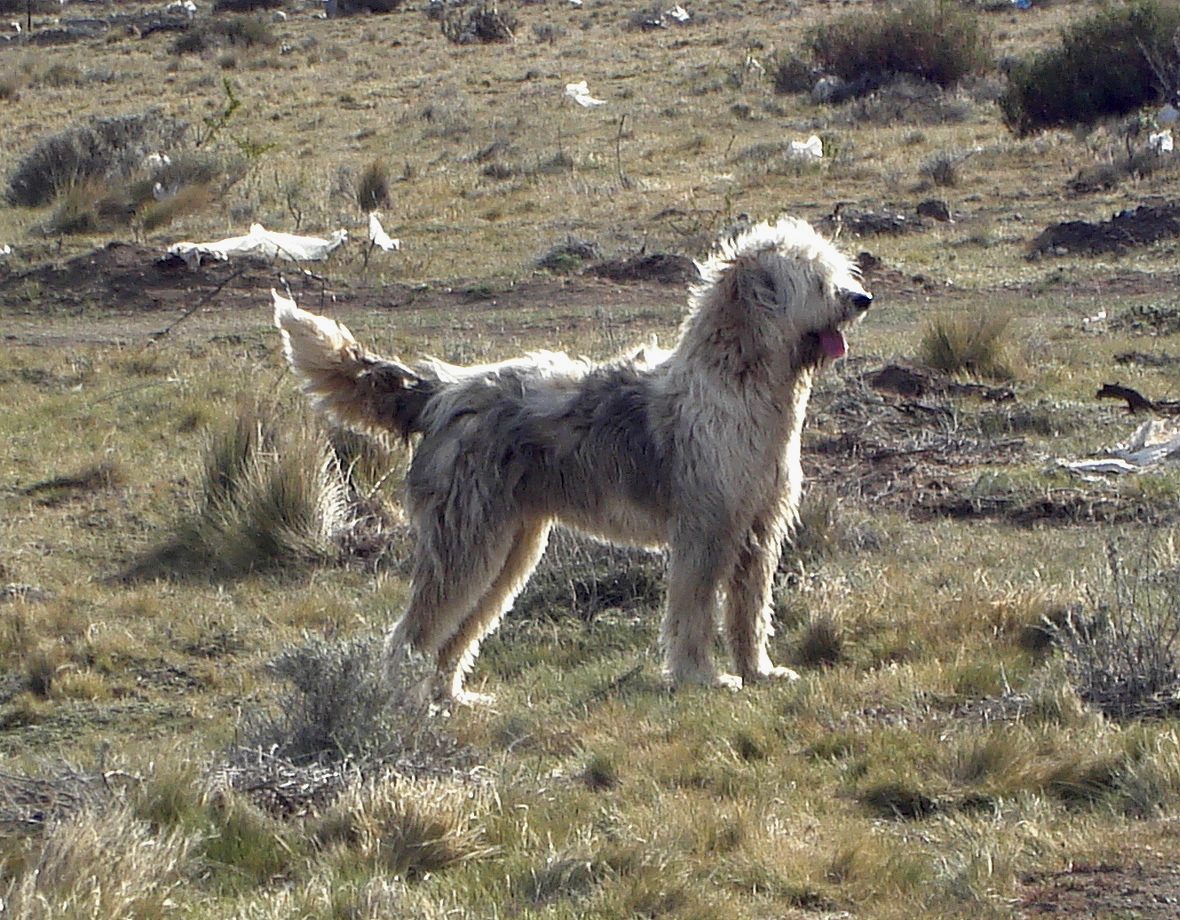
Patagonian Sheepdog

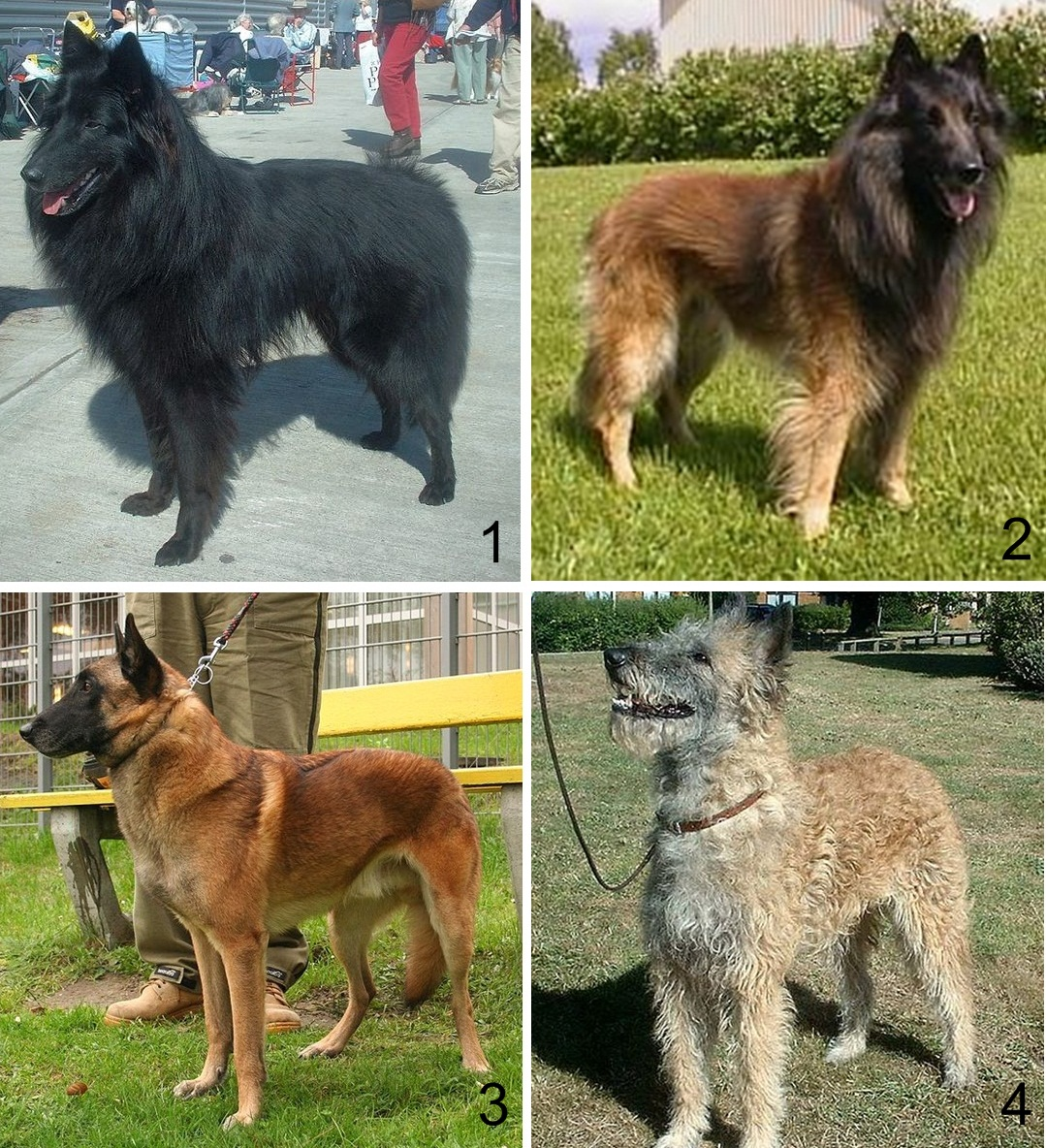
Belgian Shepherd varieties, clockwise from top left: Groenendael, Tervuren, Laekenois, Malinois

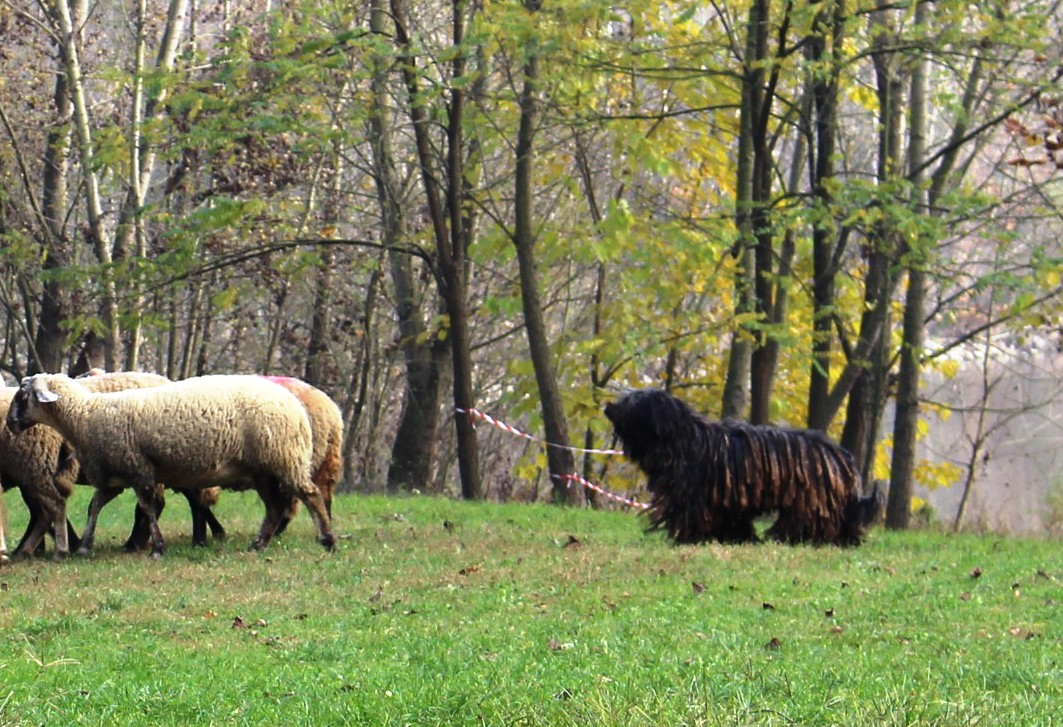
Bergamasco Sheepdog herding

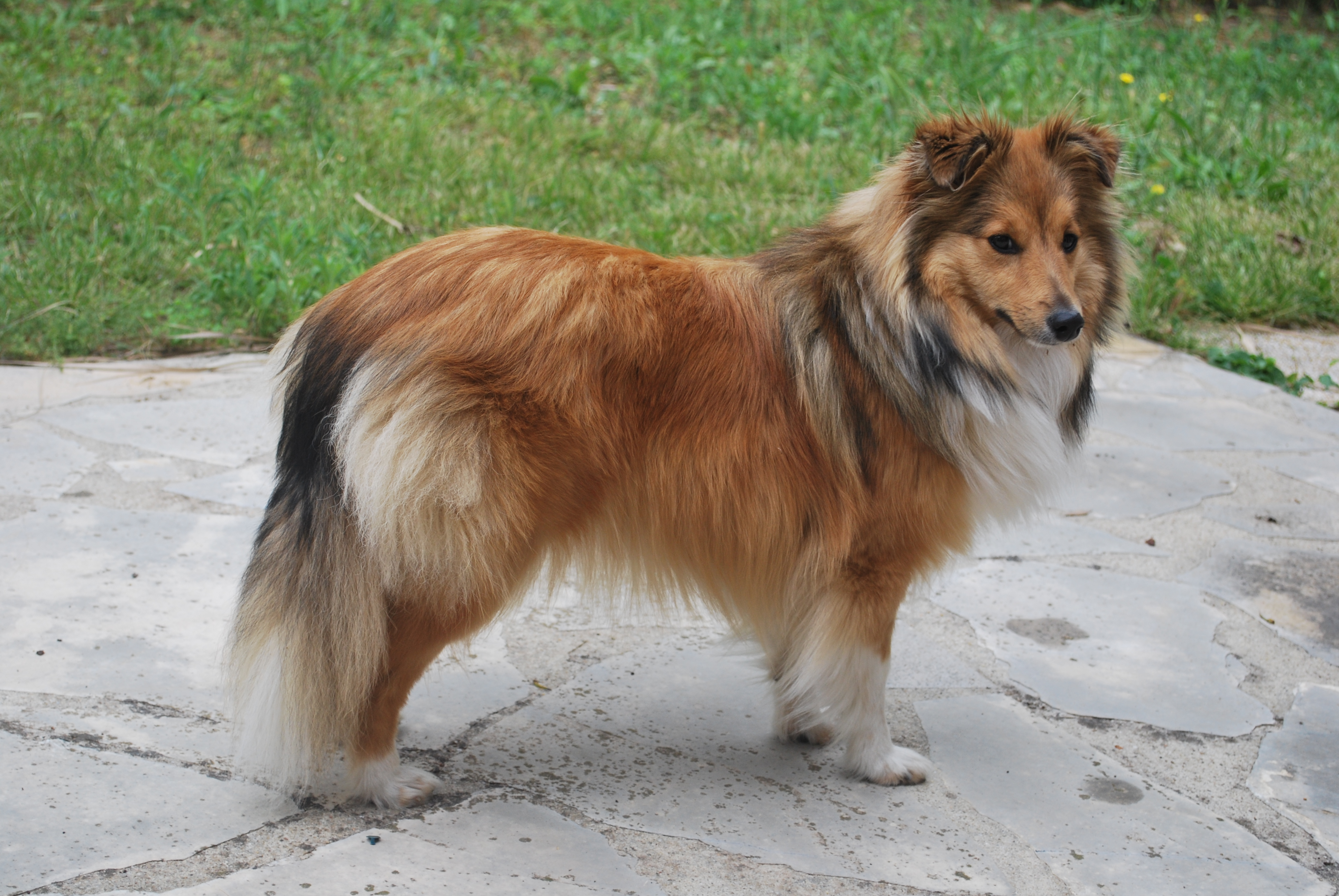
Shetland Sheepdog

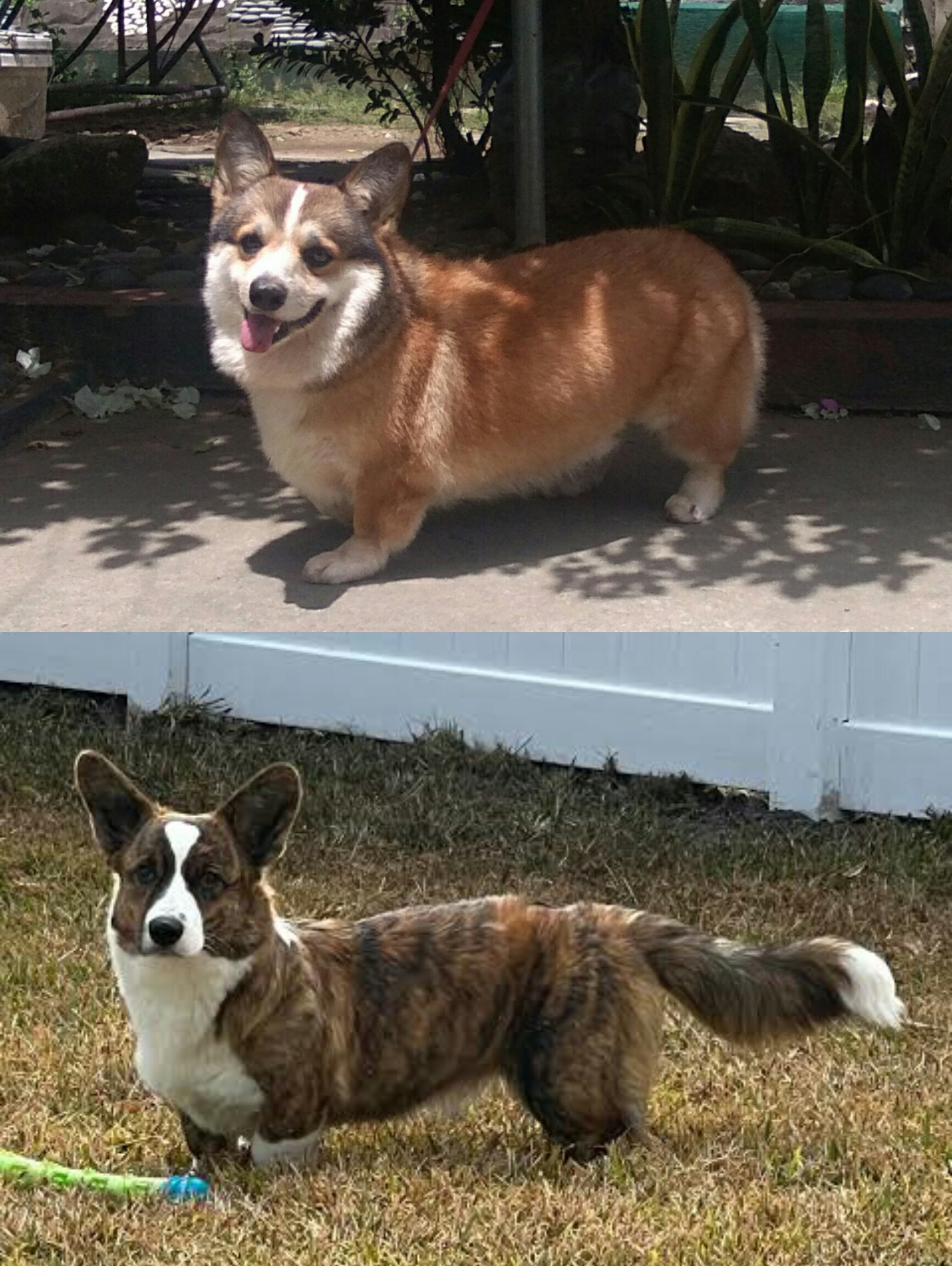
Pembroke and Cardigan Welsh Corgi

== In the modern world ==
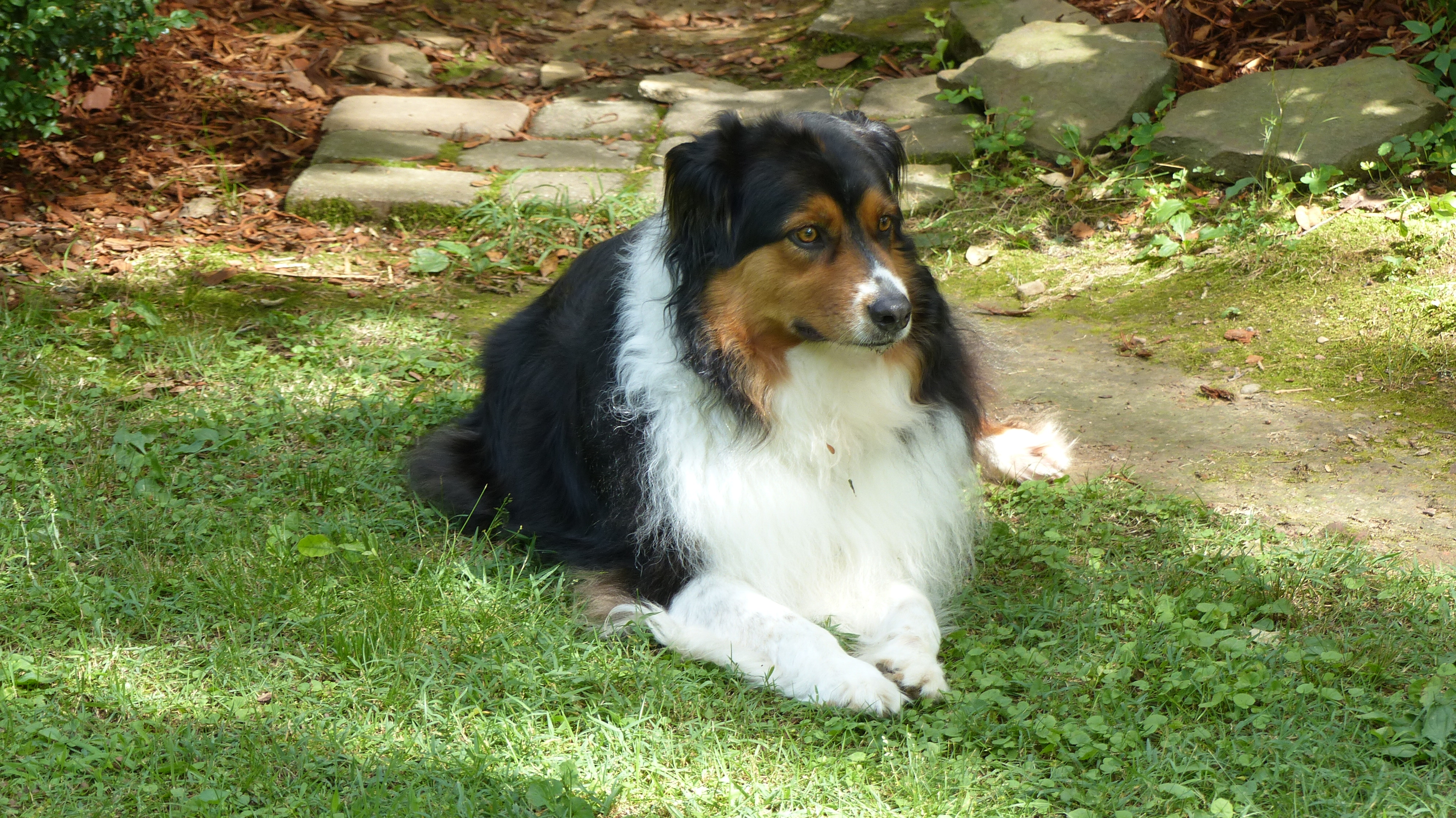
Originally used solely as a herding dog, the Australian Shepherd has become one of the most popular companion dog breeds in North America.

In countries where herding is preserved, herding dogs continue to work for their main purpose and are appreciated as effective and even irreplaceable helpers that can save labor costs and avoid investments in expensive equipment. Economic studies in Australia have shown that herding dogs are worth more than five times their cost, including training and maintenance. Meanwhile, the popularity and the number of herding dogs are growing, and the scope of work for them is narrowing.

In the 21st century, herding dogs are often chosen as family pets. The collie breeds including the Bearded Collie and Border Collie are well known, as are the Australian kelpie and Australian Working kelpie, Welsh Corgis. They make good family dogs and are at their best when they have a job to do. These dogs have been bred as working dogs and need to be physically and mentally active. They retain their herding instincts and may sometimes nip at people's heels or bump them in an effort to 'herd' their family, and may need to be trained not to do so. Their activity level and intelligence makes them excellent canine athletes. The Australian Shepherd, Shetland Sheepdog, Rough Collie, Smooth Collie and Old English Sheepdog are more popular as family companion dogs.

Dogs of herding breeds now often live in urban or suburban neighbourhoods. Their owners need to maintain their physical and mental health, taking into consideration their herding instinct and qualities. The services of dog-trainers are in demand, along with the training centres for working and sporting herding dogs, offering sheep rental and walks in the pasture. Dogs living in the suburbs and villages can work with small groups of animals or poultry. Sometimes owners even buy a few sheep so that their dogs can enjoy what they were originally bred for.

Herding dogs' high need for physical and intellectual activity can be fulfilled not only by herding, but also by other types of cynological sports. Herding dogs often occupy leading positions in agility, flyball, frisbee, dog dancing, and obedience. At the same time, in service, sport and show dogs of herding breeds that do not interact with livestock, the herding instinct is gradually weakened.

The combination of quick learning ability, physical strength, endurance, predatory behavior with dedication to the owner and a desire to work has led to the widespread use of large European Shepherds for a number of other civil and military jobs. These are the most common police and military dogs employed in the guard, search, rescue and other types of services. For example, in the United States, legally protected geese often pose serious problems for life and work. Here, border collies and other strong-eyed herding dogs are used to patrol crops, residential and recreational areas, parks, beaches, golf courses and, above all, airports. Protection from birds with the help of herding dogs turned out to be the most effective and only easily implemented way: walking through the patrolled area several times a day, the dogs force the geese to settle in places where they cause less trouble, while the nature is not being harmed.

=== Competitive herding ===
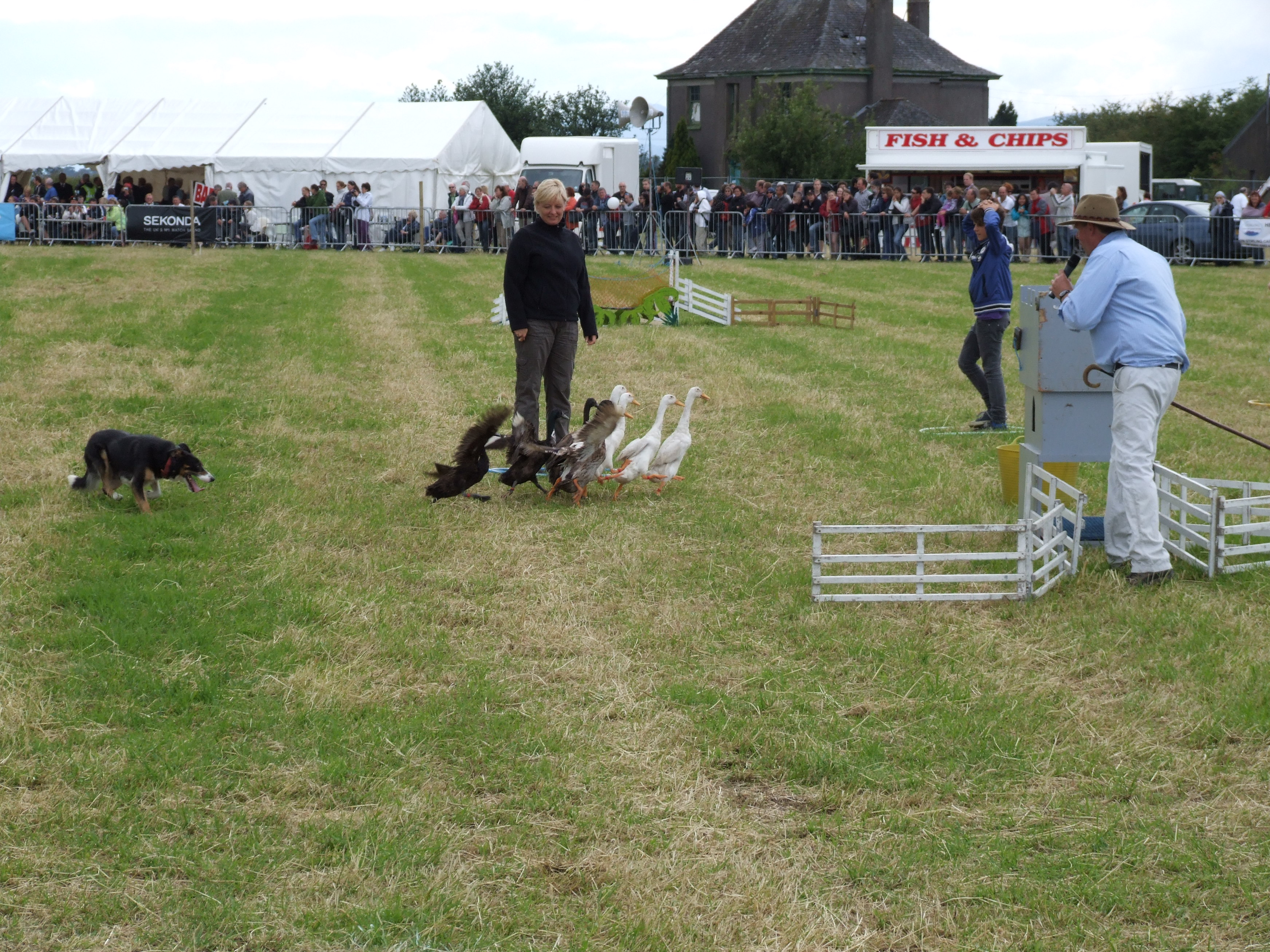
Highland games dog herding

The competitive dog sport in which herding dogs move animals around a field, fences, gates, or enclosures as directed by their handlers is called a sheepdog trial, herding test or stockdog trial depending on the area. Such events are particularly associated with hill farming areas, where sheep range widely on largely unfenced land. These trials are popular in the United Kingdom, Ireland, South Africa, Chile, Canada, the US, Australia, New Zealand and other farming nations, and have occasionally even become primetime television fare.

A border collie herding sheep into a pen at a herding trial

In the US, regular events are run by the United States Border Collie Handler's Association, Australian Shepherd Club of America, American Kennel Club and many others.

The world record price for a working border collie, Liz was broken May 2024 at the Ray White Livestock Rockhampton Working Dog Sale at Gracemere sale yards, Greenland, with £32,150.00 ($40,000) for James and Helen Parker. The previous record was in 2023 at £26,508.07 ($33,000) which was Liz's half brother, Sid and was sold to the same people, James and Helen Parker who bought Liz in 2024.

=== Basic herding dog commands ===
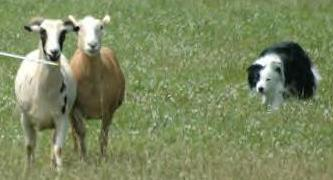
A Border Collie at work with hair sheep.

- Come by or just by - go to the left of the stock, or clockwise around them.
- Away to me, or just away or way - go to the right of the stock, or counterclockwise around them.
- Stand - stop, although when said gently may also mean just to slow down.
- Wait, (lie) down or sit or stay - stop, but remain with that contact on the stock...do not take it off by leaving.
- Steady or take time - slow down.
- Cast - gather the stock into a group. Good working dogs will cast over a large area. This is not a command but an attribute.
- Find - search for stock. A good dog will hold the stock until the shepherd arrives. Some will bark when the stock have been located.
- Get out or back - move away from the stock. Used when the dog is working too close to the stock, potentially causing the stock stress. Occasionally used as a reprimand.
- Keep away or keep - Used by some handlers as a direction and a distance from the sheep.
- Hold - keep stock where they are.
- Bark or speak up - bark at stock. Useful when more force is needed, and usually not essential for working cattle and sheep.
- Look back - return for a missed animal. Also used after a shed is completed and rejoined the flock or packet of sheep.
- In here or here - go through a gap in the flock. Used when separating stock.
- Walk up, walk on or just walk - move in closer to the stock.
- That will do - stop working and return to handler.

These commands may be indicated by a hand movement, whistle or voice. There are many other commands that are also used when working stock and in general use away from stock. Herding dog commands are generally taught using livestock as the modus operandi. Urban owners without access to livestock are able to teach basic commands through herding games.

These are not the only commands used: there are many variations. When whistles are used, each individual dog usually has a different set of commands to avoid confusion when several dogs are being worked at one time.

== See also ==
- Dogs (Protection of Livestock) Act 1953 – Act of the Parliament of the United Kingdom (in the UK)
- Livestock guardian dog – Dog type bred to protect livestock
- Working dog – Dog trained to perform practical tasks
