= Bergamasco Shepherd Dog =

Italian breed of sheepdog

Bergamasco Shepherd

- Other names: Alpine Sheepdog; Bergamasco Shepherd Dog; Bergamasco Sheepdog; Bergamasco; Cane da pastore Bergamasco; Northern Italian Sheepdog
- Origin: Italy
Traits
Height	Males	58–62 cm (23–24 in)
	Females	54–58 cm (21–23 in)
Weight	Males	32–38 kg (70–85 lb)
	Females	26–32 kg (55–70 lb)
- Coat: felted on the main parts of the body
- Colour: from pale grey to black
Kennel club standards
- Ente Nazionale della Cinofilia Italiana: standard
- Fédération Cynologique Internationale: standard

The Bergamasco Shepherd, also known as the Bergamasco Sheepdog and in Italian: Cane da Pastore Bergamasco, is an Italian breed of sheepdog. It is associated with the Alpine and pre-Alpine regions of northern Italy, where it was traditionally used to move and manage sheep and cattle.

== History ==
The origins of the Pastore Bergamasco are unknown. In 1781, G. von Albertini described Bergamasco shepherds on the Splügenberg using large dogs with long, wool-like hair to guard and drive their flocks; during migration, individual dogs could be entrusted with groups of sheep. In 1809, Johann Jakob Römer and Heinrich Rudolf Schinz similarly described large, long-haired dogs as faithful helpers of Bergamasco shepherds, with individual dogs sometimes entrusted with groups of sheep. A genetic study in 2018 found evidence of haplotypes shared with other European breeds including the Berger Picard, the Bernese Mountain Dog and the Briard.

A dog of this type was exhibited at the first Italian dog show in Milan in 1881. The first registration of the breed in the Libro Origini Italiano – the Italian national stud-book for dogs – was either in 1891 or in 1898. During the first half of the twentieth century, war, changing agricultural economics and the decline of transhumant sheep husbandry reduced the working environment that had sustained the dogs. During the development of the modern registered breed, Pietro Rota acquired Alpino di Valle Imagna from a shepherd; Alpino became an Italian champion, an influential sire and an important reference dog when a breed standard was drafted in 1946. A breed association, now called the Associazione Amatori del Cane da Pastore Bergamasco, was established in 1949. Early preservation and breeding efforts included Pietro Rota’s Valle Imagna, Luigi Guidobono Cavalchini’s Valle Scrivia and Maria Schreiber-von Albertini’s Brahama kennels. The breed was recognised by the Ente Nazionale della Cinofilia Italiana in 1956, and was definitively accepted by the Fédération Cynologique Internationale in the same year. It was recognised by the American Kennel Club in 2015.

In the nine years from 2011 to 2019, annual registrations in Italy averaged 97 per year, with a maximum of 149 and a minimum of 48.

== Characteristics ==
The Bergamasco is a robust and rustic dog of medium size, solidly built and well proportioned. In outline, the body ranges from nearly square to slightly longer than tall. Dogs stand some 58–62 cm at the withers, and weigh about 32–38 kg; bitches are about 4 cm smaller, and weigh on average 6 kg less.

The coat is long and thick, and covers every part of the dog. Particularly on the hind part of the body, it forms long matted locks which provide good protection from bad weather; on the fore part of the body the hair is coarse and forms wavy ringlets like those of a goat, while the hair on the head is rather finer. The coat may be of any shade of grey, from very pale to matt black; some tinges of isabella or fulvous colour are allowable.
