= Adult blaschkitis =

- Specialty: Dermatology

Adult blaschkitis is a rare inflammatory skin condition presenting as pruritic papules and vesicles along multiple lines of Blaschko.

== See also ==
- Lichen striatus
- List of cutaneous conditions
