= Brindle =

Coat coloring pattern in some animals

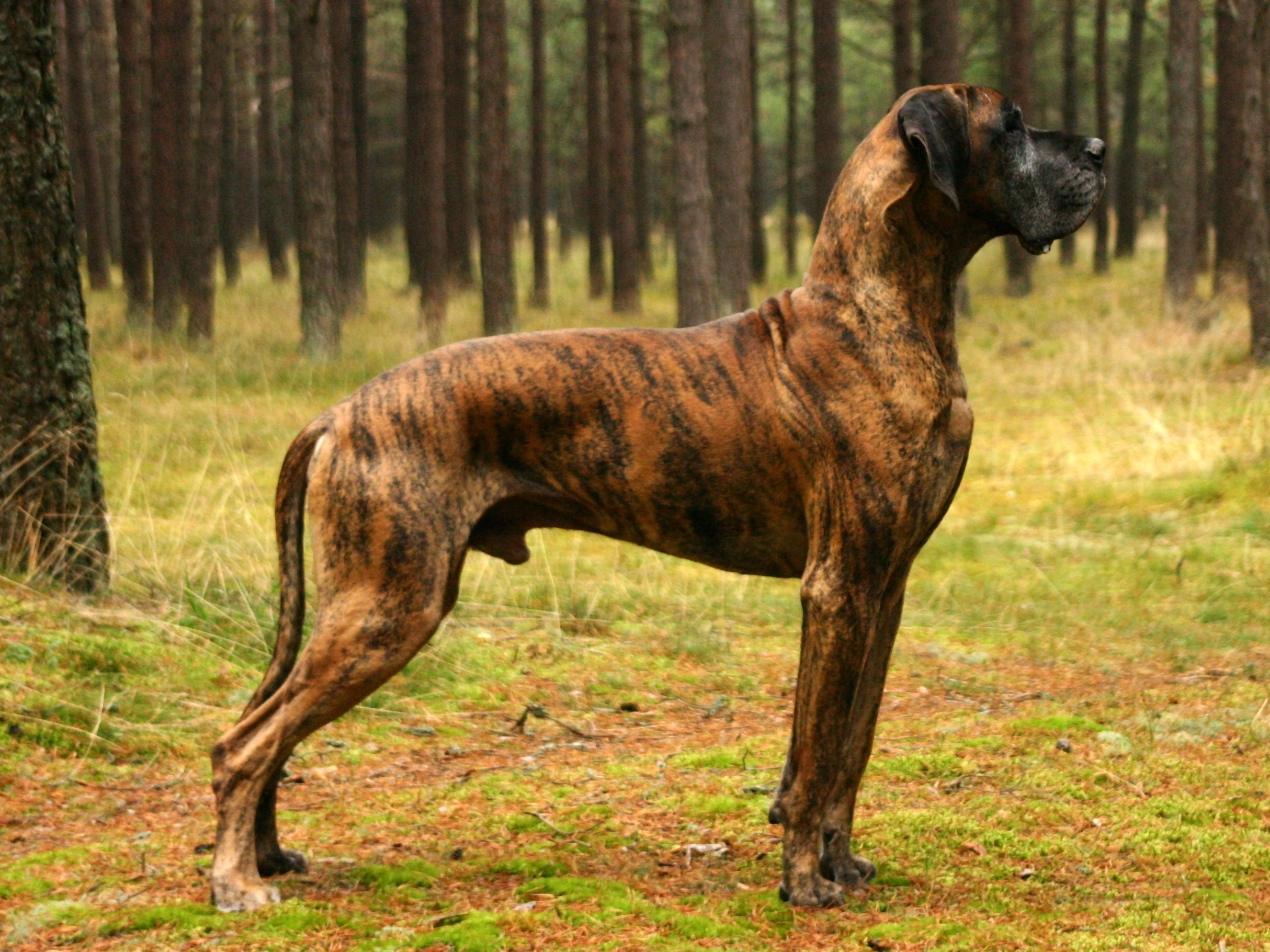
A Great Dane with the brindle color pattern

Brindle is a coat coloring pattern in animals, particularly dogs, cattle, guinea pigs, cats, and, rarely, horses. It is sometimes described as "tiger-striped", although the brindle pattern is more subtle than that of a tiger's coat.

Brindle typically appears as black stripes on a red base. The stripes are eumelanin (black/brown pigment) and the base is phaeomelanin (red/yellow pigment), so the appearance of those pigments can be changed by any of the genes which usually affect them.

- Eumelanin (the pigment making up the stripes) can be affected by: merle (and harlequin), liver, dilution, greying, and recessive red.
- Phaeomelanin (the pigment making up the base) can be affected by: Intensity locus.

White markings and ticking can occur on any brindle dog.

Brindle is caused by a complex gene process and is technically a form of mosaicism, where some cells express one allele (KB) and other cells express a different allele (ky), a little like tortoiseshell cats. This makes it very difficult to test for, and there are currently no commercially available tests that are able to detect brindle. Brindle dogs will usually test as KBky, and carriers (one dominant black allele, one brindle) cannot be identified without breeding.

== Dogs ==
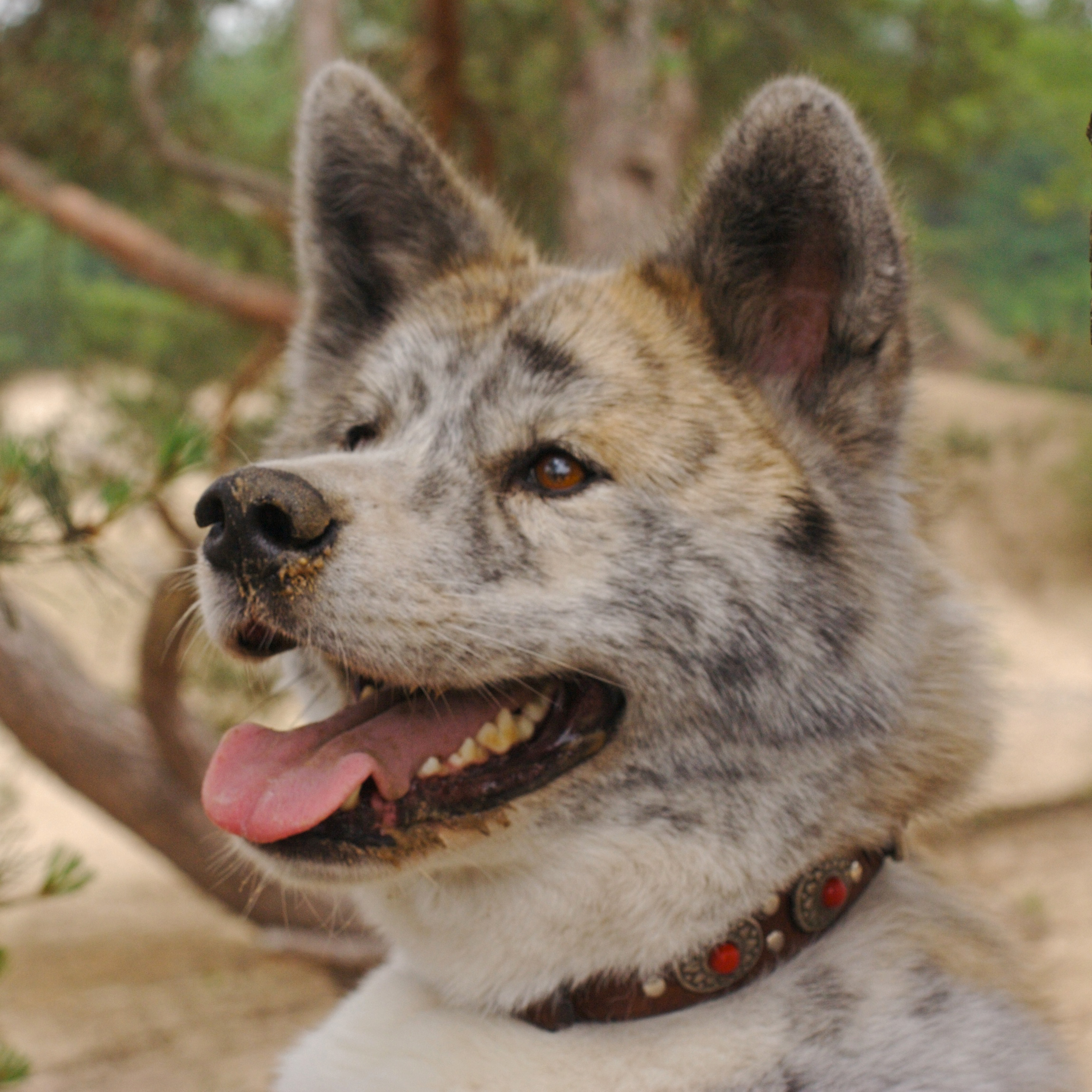
Brindle coloration is less distinct on longer-haired dogs, like the Akita Inu.

The brindle pattern may also take the place of tan in tricolor coats of some dog breeds (such as Basenjis). This coloration looks very similar to tricolor, and can be distinguished only at close range. Dogs of this color are often described as "trindle". It can also occur in combination with merle in the points, or as a brindle merle, in breeds such as the Cardigan Welsh Corgi, although the latter is not acceptable in the show ring. The "dark" markings are black or the dilutions gray (called blue) or brown (sometimes called red). It is not uncommon for a brindled Cairn Terrier to become progressively more black or silver as it ages.

== Cats ==
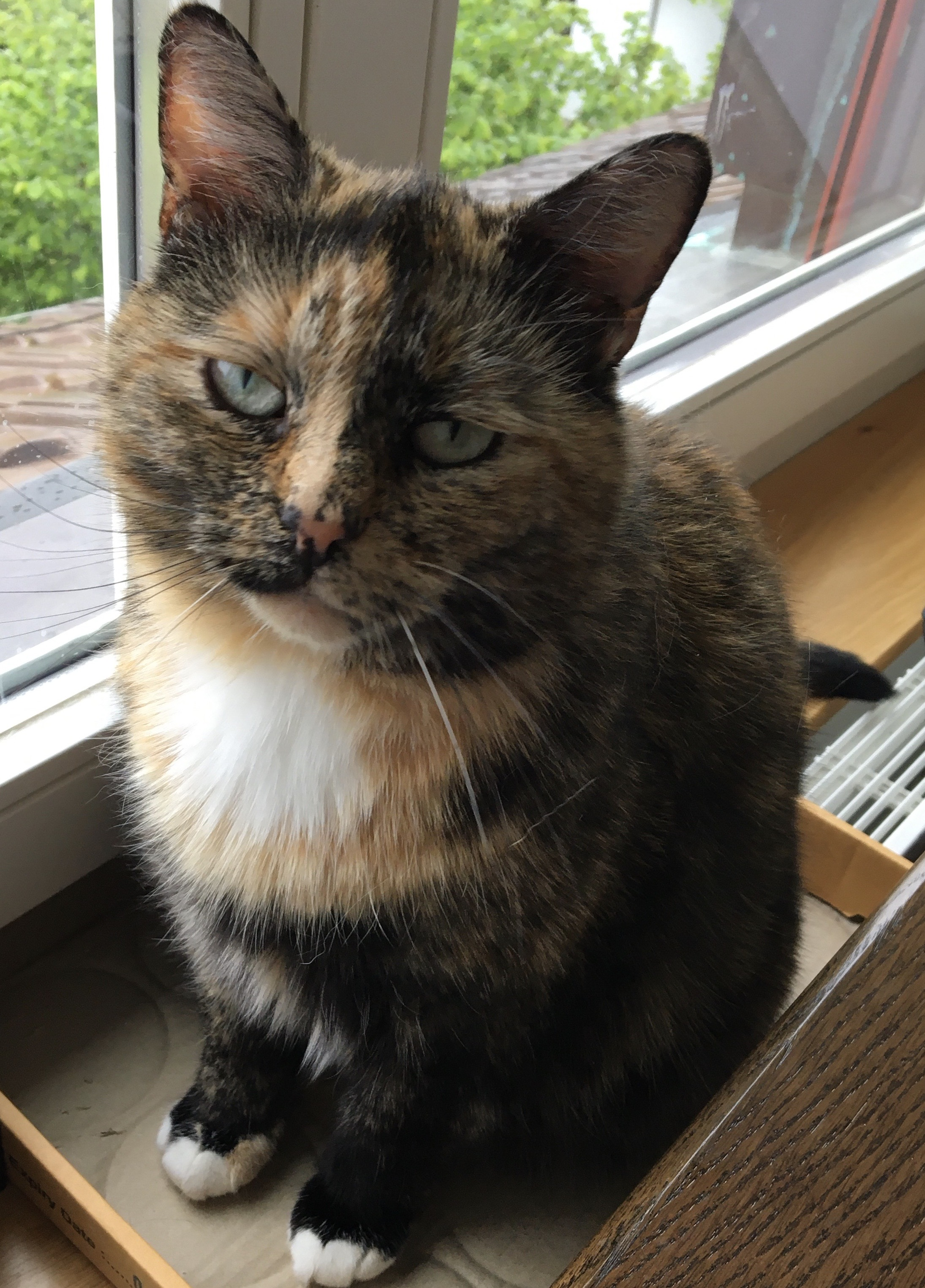
A European domestic short-haired, female, brindled cat.

Brindled domestic cats are also known as tortoiseshell cats, and in some cases, tabby cats; they are almost exclusively female.

== Guinea pigs ==
Brindle is an old variety in guinea pigs. They are difficult to breed to perfection, as the black and red hairs should intermingle evenly all over. Brindle guinea pigs' fur type is Abyssinian (rosetted).

== Horses ==
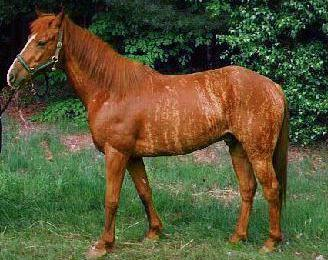
A reverse brindle chestnut

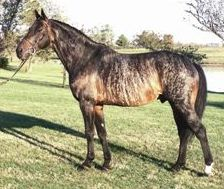
Brindle horse with dark bay base coat

Brindle coloring in horses is extremely rare and most commonly caused by pigment concentrating along Blaschko's lines during fetal development. In two confirmed cases it has been linked to spontaneous chimerism, resulting in an animal with two sets of DNA, with the brindle pattern being an expression of two different sets of equine coat color genes in one horse. These forms are not heritable. In some horses the pattern seems to be inherited, indicating that one or more genes are responsible. One heritable brindle pattern in a family of American Quarter Horses was identified in 2016 and named Brindle1 (BR1). The Brindle1 phenotype has an X-linked, semidominant mode of inheritance. Female horses with this gene have a striped coat pattern; hairs from the stripes have a different texture as well as color, are less straight, and are more unruly. Male horses have sparse manes and tails but do not show a striped coat texture pattern. A Brindle1 test is available.

Brindle coloring consists of irregular stripes extending vertically over the horse's body and horizontally around the legs. Brindle horses can also have a dorsal stripe when caused by dun or non-dun1. It usually does not affect the head and legs as much as the body, with the heaviest concentrations of brindling being on the neck, shoulders and hindquarters. The coloring has been documented in the past. At the Zoological Museum of the Academy of Science in Saint Petersburg, a Russian cab horse of brindle coloring from the early 19th century was mounted and put on display due to its rarity.

=== Description ===
The brindled pattern found in horses could be described as vertical stripes that are found along the neck, back, hindquarters, and upper legs. The horse's head is usually a solid color and is not affected by the striping. The brindled pattern has no effect on dark points on horses. Some brindle-colored horses are more eye-catching than others.

With this coat pattern there is a base coat that covers the entire body of the horse. This base coat color can be any color. Recorded examples have been bay, chestnut, palomino, and dun. Earliest documented cases were said to have red dun or grulla as a base coat. Over top of the base color is either a lighter or darker color, giving the appearance of stripes.

== Other animals ==
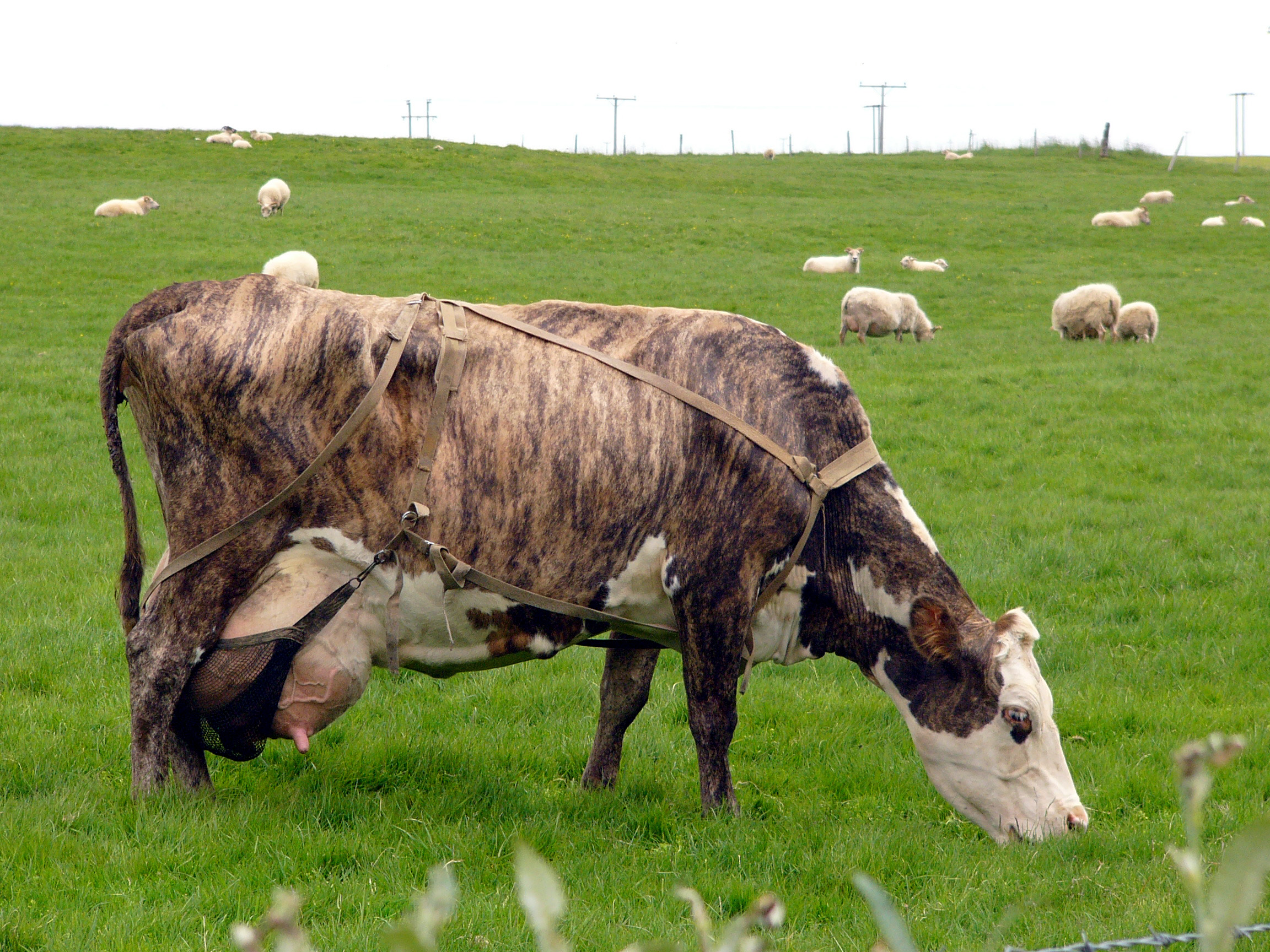
A brindled cow

Brindle coloring exists in cattle.

The Blue Wildebeest is a species of brindled gnu.

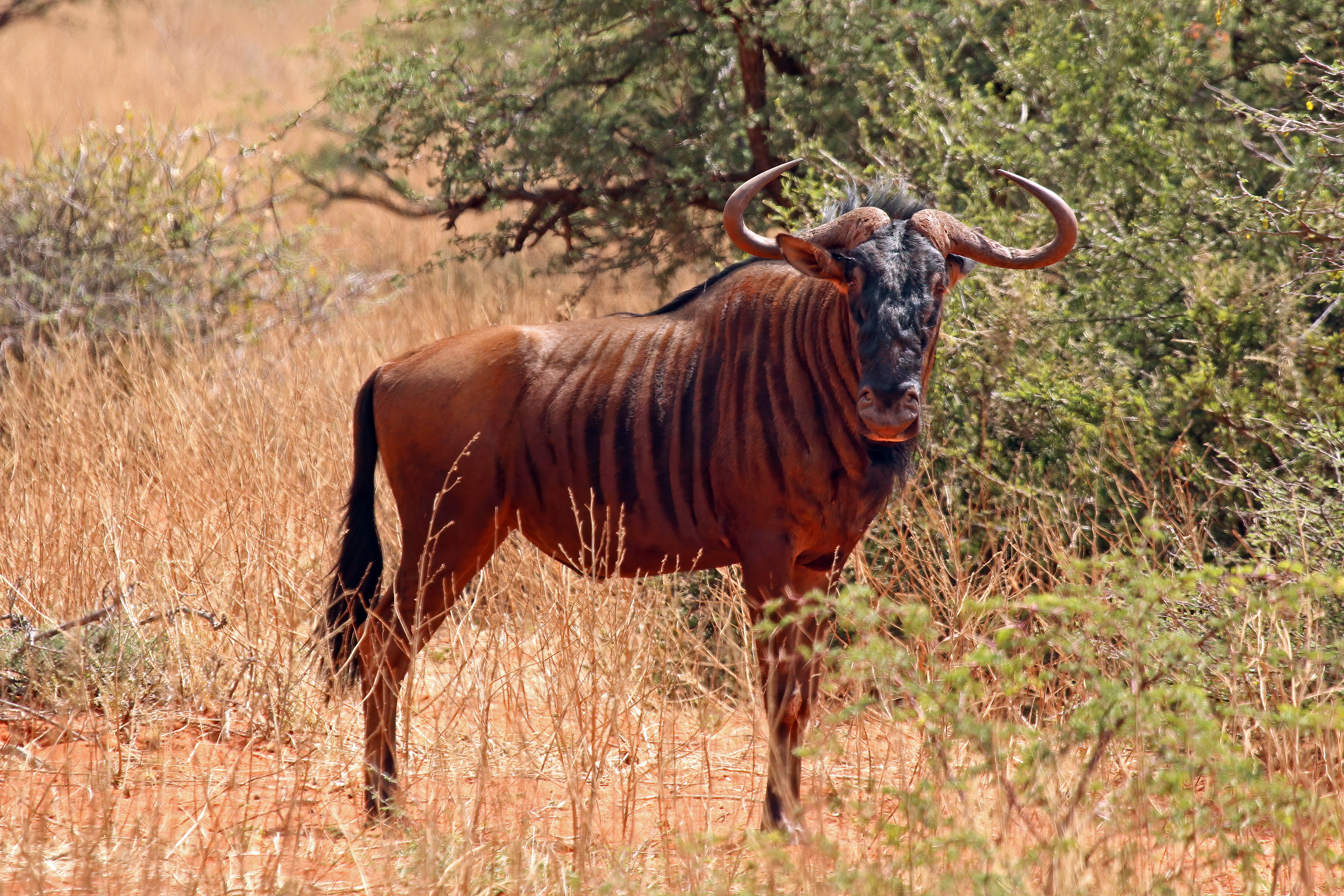
Male brindled gnu at the Tswalu Kalahari Reserve, South Africa

For crested geckos, the term "brindle" is used to describe a morph with darker stripes of color.

== Etymology ==
The word brindled is a variant of Middle English brended (early 15c.), from bren "brown color" (13c.), noun from past participle of brennen "burn" (from Proto-Germanic *brennan "to burn", from PIE root *gwher- "to heat, warm"). The etymological sense of the adjective appears to be "marked as though by branding or burning".

== In literature ==
- A brindle horse was mentioned in the book Riding Lessons by Sara Gruen.
- "Jock of the Bushveld" was a brindle Staffordshire Bull Terrier mix and the companion of Percy FitzPatrick in his travels around the South African veldt in the 1880s. FitzPatrick later collected tales of their adventures into a popular book of the same name.
- Jack the bulldog featured in the Little House on the Prairie books by Laura Ingalls Wilder had a brindled coat. He was the companion and household protector of the Ingalls family in their early travels. He dies of old age at the beginning of By the Shores of Silver Lake.
- In Gerard Manley Hopkins' poem "Pied Beauty" (1918), the concept occurs in the opening:

Glory be to God for dappled things —
For skies of couple-color as a brinded cow;
For rose-moles all in stipple upon trout that swim ...

=== But not Shakespeare ===
In William Shakespeare's play Macbeth, the opening of act 4, scene 1, is often taken to refer to a brindled cat in the sense of coat pattern as described in this article, because it does contain the word "brinded":

Thrice the brinded cat hath mew'd.

However, in this context – Elizabethan English – the word "brinded" was used to mean branded, as in marked by fire. Elizabethans used the word "streaked" to describe a brindle-colored coat.

== See also ==
- Dog coat
- Equine coat color
- Tabby cat
- Tortoiseshell cat
