= Linear and whorled nevoid hypermelanosis =

- Other names: Linear nevoid hyperpigmentation
- Specialty: Medical genetics

Linear and whorled nevoid hypermelanosis (also known as "Linear nevoid hyperpigmentation," "Progressive cribriform and zosteriform hyperpigmentation," "Reticulate and zosteriform hyperpigmentation," "Reticulate hyperpigmentation of Iijima and Naito and Uyeno," "Zebra-like hyperpigmentation in whorls and streaks," and "Zebra-line hyperpigmentation") is a disorder of pigmentation that develops within a few weeks of birth and progresses for one to two years before stabilizing. There is linear and whorled hyperpigmentation following the lines of Blaschko without preceding bullae or verrucous lesions. It is important to exclude other pigmentary disorders following the Blaschko lines before making a diagnosis of linear and whorled nevoid hypermelanosis. The differential diagnoses include incontinentia pigmenti, linear epidermal nevus, hypomelanosis of Ito and Goltz syndrome. Recently, a case of linear and whorled nevoid hypermelanosis was reported in a Malaysian Chinese girl.

== See also ==
- Skin lesion
- List of cutaneous conditions
