= Miniature American Shepherd =

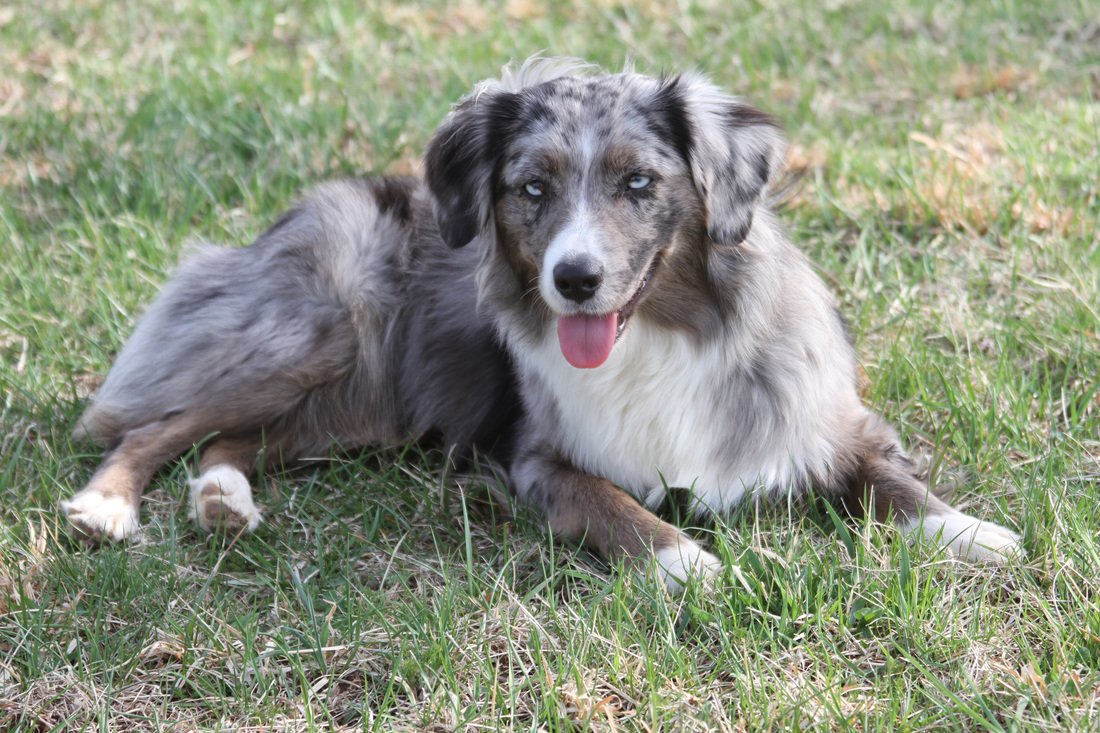
- Blue Merle Miniature American Shepherd
- Other names: Miniature Australian Shepherd; Toy Australian Shepherd; Berger Miniature Américain; Miniatur Amerikanischer Schäferhund; Pastor Miniatura American
- Common nicknames: Mini American, MAS, Mini Aussie
- Origin: United States
Traits
Height	Males	14–18 in (36–46 cm)
	Females	13–17 in (33–43 cm)
- Coat: Medium length double coat
- Color: Black, blue merle, red, red merle, with or without tan and/or white markings in specified areas
- Litter size: 2–6 puppies
Kennel club standards
- American Kennel Club: standard
- Fédération Cynologique Internationale: standard

The Miniature American Shepherd, frequently abbreviated MAS, is a small herding dog breed. The MAS is highly intelligent and biddable. The breed is often trained for dog sports such as herding, agility, obedience, canine freestyle, flyball, and others. The Miniature American Shepherd was recognised by the American Kennel Club (AKC) in 2015 and is the club's 186th breed. In September 2019, the Fédération Cynologique Internationale (FCI) officially accepted the breed.

== History ==
The MAS was bred first in the United States as a small herding and working dog. The Miniature American Shepherd (at that time still known as the Miniature Australian Shepherd) was first developed in the late 1960s by breeding what was thought to be small size Australian Shepherds, and by the mid-1970s the breed had reached its current desired size. In many areas and kennel clubs the Miniature American Shepherd is still used as a working breed in competitions.

The predecessor to MASCUSA was the North American Miniature Australian Shepherd Club of the United States, NAMASCUSA and was the first Parent club registry for the Mini Aussie. The second club to register Mini Aussies Miniature Australian Shepherd Club of America MASCA is currently active but no longer accepts dogs registered as MAS with AKC. AKC MAS dogs may still breed to Mini Aussies however.

In 1993 the original MASCUSA club was asked by the AKC to change its name. Additionally, Miniature Australian Shepherds could no longer participate under their chosen name as it was too similar to that of an AKC affiliated breed, so the Miniature Australian Shepherd was renamed the North American Shepherd.

In 1993, MASCUSA (the original organisation) became the North American Miniature Australian Shepherd Club of America. For the next 15 years, there were numerous clubs that were formed, reorganised, and sometimes went defunct, trying to come to a consensus concerning the emerging breed. Enough members were eventually interested in obtaining separate recognition, thus prompting members of NAMASCUSA to approach the AKC. Working as a team with AKC and USASA, the name and breed of Miniature American Shepherd was born. The Miniature Australian Shepherd community is still divided over this compromise. In May 2011, the MASCUSA club was chosen by AKC as the parent club of the newly named Miniature American Shepherd. The Miniature American Shepherd Club of the USA achieved full AKC recognition and acceptance for the breed on July 1, 2015.

== Breed characteristics ==
The Miniature American Shepherd is a small dog, with the breed standard specifying a height of 14-18 inches (36–46 cm) for males and 13-17 inches (33–43 cm) for females. The topline is level from withers to hip joint. The tail may be undocked, a natural bobtail, or may be docked to a length not exceeding three inches.

Recognised coat colors in the breed are tri-color, blue merle, red merle, and red (liver). There are no specified quantities of marbling, flecking, or blotching for merle coats. Tan markings are permissible anywhere around the eyes and face, as well as on the feet, legs, chest, muzzle, underside of the neck and body, under the tail and on the undersides of the ears. White markings are permissible, but limited to the muzzle, cheeks, crown of the head, in a blaze on the head, in a partial or full collar on the neck and on the belly, chest, front legs and hind legs to the hock. White markings should not cover more than 25% of the ear and white body markings outside of the above permitted areas may disqualify the dog from conformation shows.

The MAS has an expected lifespan of 13–15 years. Several chronic diseases and detrimental genetic traits are known to exist within the MAS gene pool, including progressive retinal atrophy (PRA-prcd), hereditary cataracts, iris coloboma, micropthalmia, multi-drug resistance gene (MDR1), hip dysplasia, and degenerative myelopathy. They are classified as a high-energy breed, and require frequent exercise and mental stimulation.

== See also ==
- List of dog breeds
