= Karl Langer =

Austrian anatomist

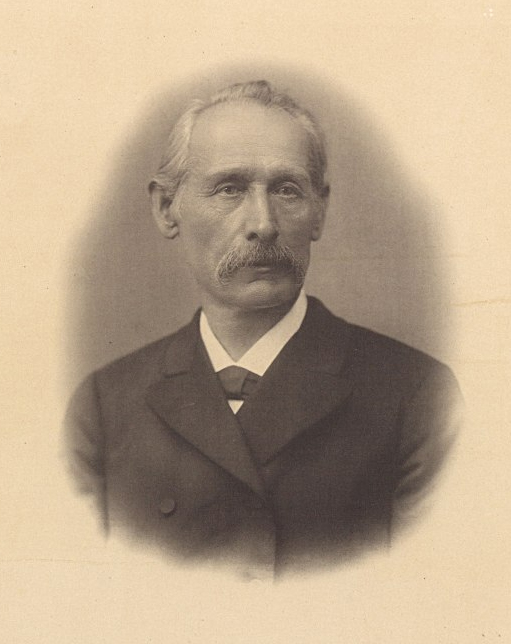
Karl Langer

Karl Langer, Ritter von Edenberg (15 April 1819, Vienna – 8 December 1887) was an Austrian anatomist. He is known for his work in the field of topographical anatomy.

He studied medicine at the Universities of Vienna and Prague, afterwards working as a prosector in Vienna under Joseph Hyrtl (1810–1894). In 1856 he became a professor at the Josephinum, later serving as director of the second institute of anatomy at the University of Vienna (1870–74). In 1874 he succeeded Hyrtl as director of the first institute of anatomy. With Christian August Voigt (1808–1890), he was tasked with planning for construction of a new Viennese anatomical institute.

== Selected writings ==
- Zur Anatomie und Physiologie der Haut, 1861 – later translated into English as "The anatomy and physiology of the skin" (1943).
- Wachsthum des menschlichen Skeletes mit Bezug auf den Riesen, 1872 – Growth of the human skeleton with respect to gigantism.
- Lehrbuch der systematischen und topographischen Anatomie, 1882 – Textbook of systematic and topographical anatomy.
- Anatomie der äusseren Formen des menschlichen Körpers, 1884 – Anatomy of the external forms of the human body.

== Anatomical terms ==
- Langer's arch: Also known as the "pectorodorsalis muscle" or as the "axillary arch muscle".
- Langer lines: Cleavage lines that correspond to the alignment of collagen fibers within the dermis.

== Notes ==
- Biography @ Deutsche Biographie
