= Skin line =

Skin lines are anatomical features on the skin, which include: Langer's lines, Blaschko's lines, and Kraissl's lines. They have uses in some surgeries, or in diagnosis.

== Types ==
Langer's lines are topological lines made on a map of the human body. The lines run parallel to collagen fibers. They are useful in forensics, and some surgeries. Langer's lines are useful in cosmetic surgery, and breast surgery where they include static tension lines that can mark a guide for the incisions.

Kraissl's lines are lines of maximal skin tension.

Blaschko's lines are lines of normal cell development in the skin. Sometimes they are due to genetic conditions and may exhibit different amounts of melanin. The volume expansion seen in pregnancy can create strange skin patterns known as Blashko's lines.

=== Relaxed skin tension lines ===
Relaxed skin tension lines (RSTL) are natural skin lines that indicate the direction of the collagen fibers in the skin of humans when the skin is relaxed. Albert F. Borges first described the concept of using RSTL for planning excisions of skin lesions on the face in 1984; as a result, they are sometimes referred to as Borges lines. RSTL become visible when the skin is relaxed and are traced by pinching at a right angle to the RSTL. Since scars become smaller and heal faster when the skin is under the least amount of tension, knowledge of the patient's RSTL can help surgeons know how to make a cut in the skin that optimizes cosmetic outcomes and reduces the time to heal.
