= Australian Shepherd =

American breed of dog

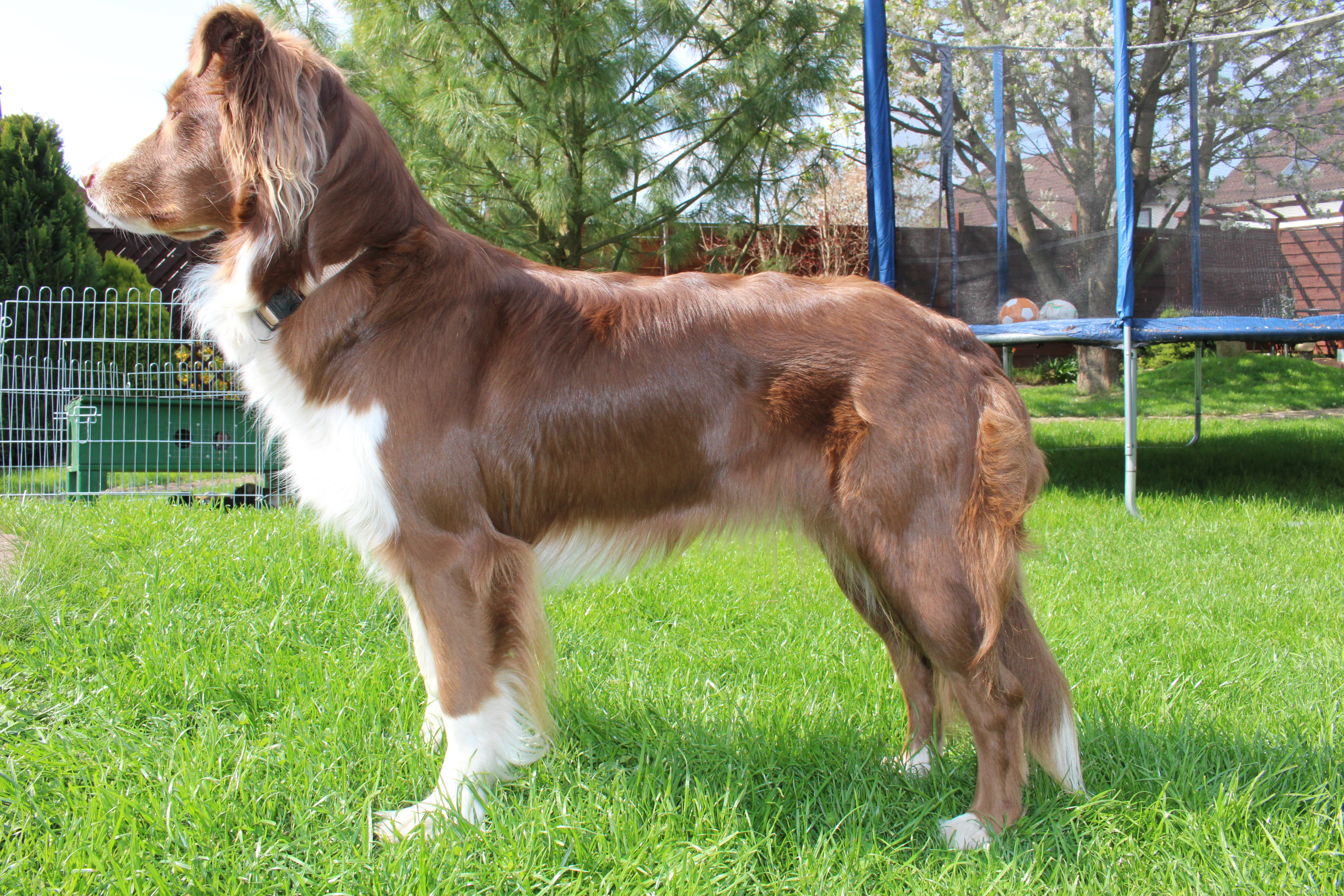
- Common nicknames: Aussie
- Origin: United States
Traits
Height	Males	20–23 in (51–58 cm)
	Females	18–21 in (46–53 cm)
- Weight: 35–70 lb (16–32 kg)
- Coat: Moderately long double coat
- Color: Blue or red merle, solid black or red, and/or white markings and/or tan points or a mixture of all
Kennel club standards
- American Kennel Club: standard
- United Kennel Club: standard
- Fédération Cynologique Internationale: standard

The Australian Shepherd, also known as the Aussie, is a breed of herding dog from the United States. Despite the name, the breed was developed in California in the 19th century. It is believed to have its origins in sheepdog breeds from northwest Spain, as well as collies imported, alongside sheep, from Australia and New Zealand; the breed reportedly took its name from this trade. Originally used solely as a herding dog, the Australian Shepherd has become one of the most popular companion dog breeds in North America.

== History ==
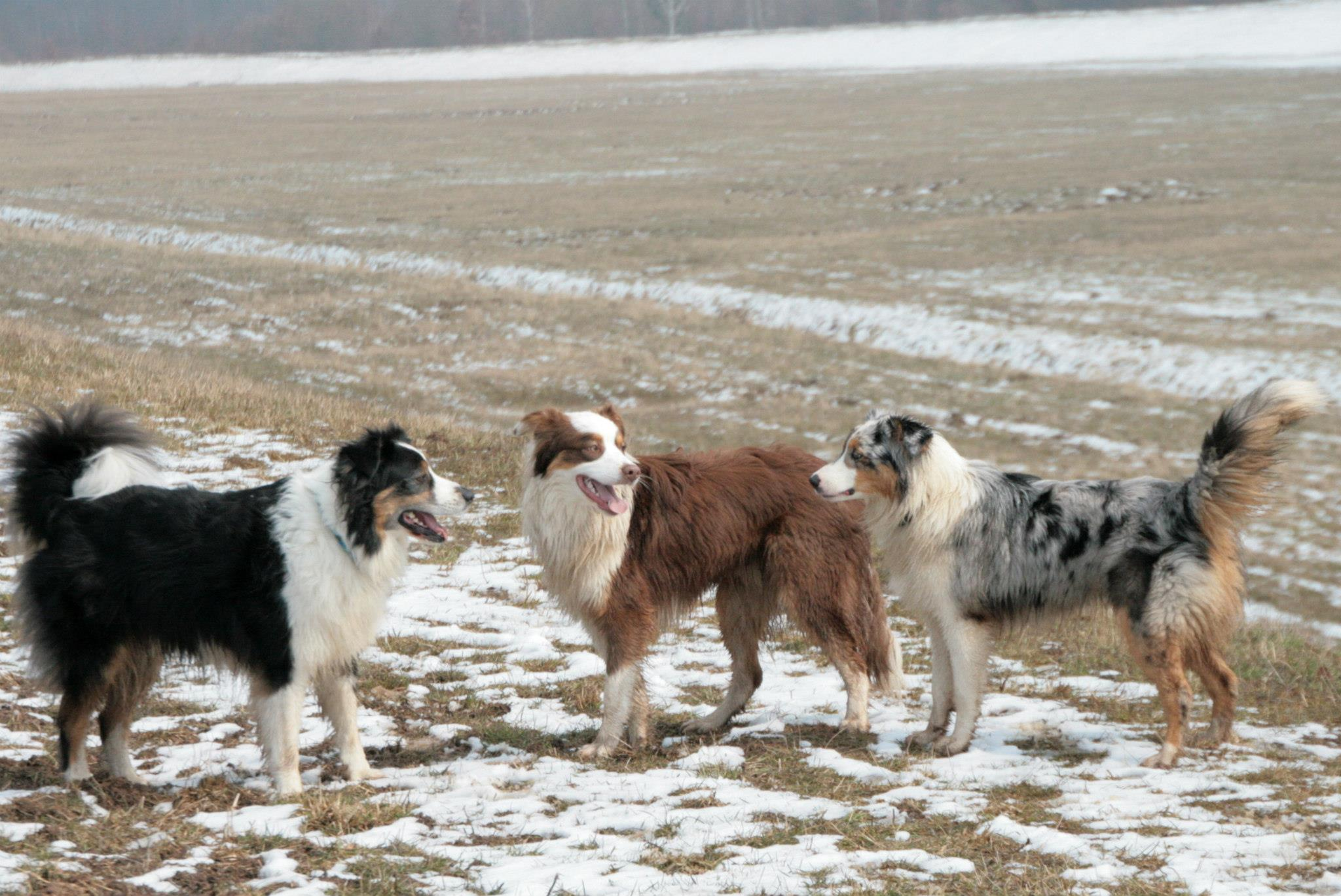
Three Australian Shepherds

The Australian Shepherd descends in part from pastoral dogs brought to herd Spanish flocks in North America as early as the 1500s. There is some speculation that these dogs included the Carea Leonés, a mountain sheepdog that can display the eye color and merle coat found in many contemporary Australian Shepherds. It is sometimes claimed that the Basque Shepherd Dog and the Pyrenean Sheepdog were also among the ancestors of the breed. The breed as it is known today developed in California in the 19th century, as a sheep herding dog for Californian shepherds. The Australian Shepherd is also believed to be descended from a variety of herding dogs imported to California with imported sheep, including collies from Australia and New Zealand. It was from these ancestors that the breed took its name.

The Australian Shepherd spread from California throughout the Western United States where it became extremely popular with ranchers who valued the breed's sheep working qualities, as well as their ability to handle cattle and other livestock. A purely working breed for over a century, the Australian Shepherd was virtually unknown outside of the livestock industry until the mid-20th century when the breed was popularised by Jay Sisler, a rodeo performer, at rodeos across the western states with his Australian Shepherds performing all manner of tricks. A breed club was soon formed to promote the breed, the Australian Shepherd Club of America, and kennel club recognition followed in 1979 when the breed was recognised by the United Kennel Club. The breed was subsequently recognised by the American Kennel Club in the 1990s and later the Fédération Cynologique Internationale.

From the late-20th century the Australian Shepherd has increasingly been seen in conformation shows and it has become an extremely popular companion dog. In 2024 it was ranked by the American Kennel Club as the 12th most popular breed of dog in the United States.

== Description ==
=== Appearance ===
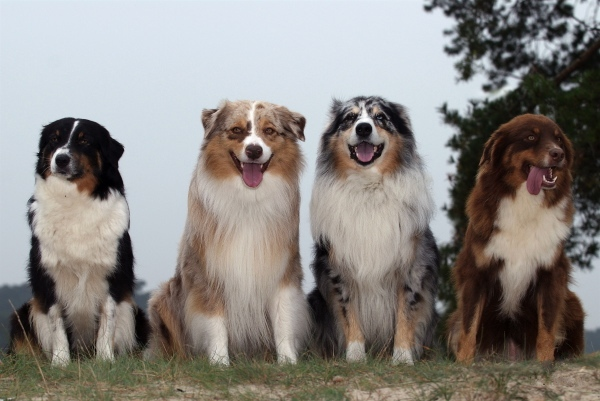
Variations of Australian Shepherd colors

The Australian Shepherd is a medium-sized, athletic breed; they typically stand between 18 and 23 inches (46 and 58 cm) and weigh between 35 and 70 pounds (16 and 32 kg). The parent club, the Australian Shepherd Club of America's breed standard states male dogs should stand between 20 and 23 inches (51 and 58 cm) and females between 18 and 21 inches (46 and 53 cm), at the withers; the standard does allow individual animals to exceed these limits slightly.

The Australian Shepherd has a moderately long and wavy double coat that has a dense undercoat and coarse topcoat; the coat is short on the face and well feathered on the rear of the legs. The breed is known for its unique colorations and variable coat patterns, it being said no two dogs sharing a coat. The breed standard allows for blue merle, red merle, solid black or solid red, with or without white markings and with or without tan points.

Examples of the breed can be born with long or naturally bobbed (short) tails; traditionally long tailed dogs had their tails docked, although some countries outside of the United States do not allow docking and so some long tailed and partial bob tails are allowed to be exhibited in those countries.

=== Temperament ===
The Australian Shepherd is described as intelligent, active, loyal, protective, playful, and adaptive. The modern breed is predominantly bred for pets; despite this, many retain a strong herding instinct and it is not uncommon for companion dogs of the breed to try to herd children or other pets. A very active breed, the Australian Shepherd is known to become destructive if it does not receive adequate exercise.

== Health ==
A 2024 UK study found a median life expectancy of 13.7 years based on a sample of 62 deaths, which was above the median of 12.7 years for purebreeds and 12 years for crossbreeds.

Based on a sample of 48 still-living dogs, the most common health concerns noted by owners were eye problems (red eye, epiphora, conjunctivitis, and cataracts). Dermatological and respiratory problems also ranked high.

The Australian Shepherd is one of the more commonly affected breeds for an autosomal recessive mutation of the MDR1 gene. This mutation causes greater sensitivity to certain drugs at normally safe doses, including ivermectin. A test is available to determine if a particular dog carries the mutated gene.

Australian Shepherds show relatively low levels (approximately 6%) of hip dysplasia, a heritable condition where the femur does not fit securely in the pelvic socket of the hip joint.

The Australian Shepherd is one of the breeds more commonly affected by hereditary cataracts.

=== Double merle ===
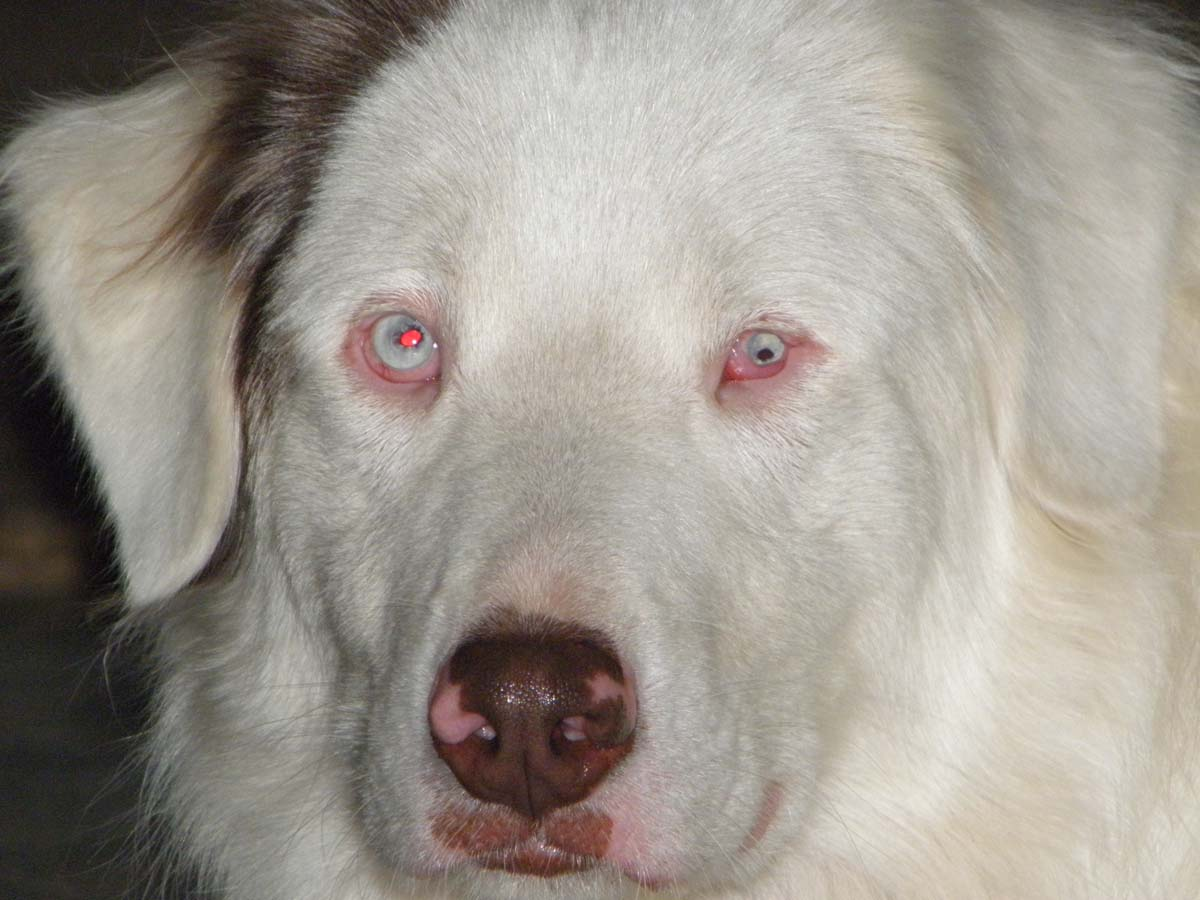
An example of an abnormal eye of a double merle, "lethal white", Australian Shepherd: The abnormally small left eye is known as microphthalmia, and the pupil shows signs of subluxation which is dropped, not centered.

Double merles often have excessive light or white areas and can have hearing and vision problems as a result of having two copies of the merle gene. Homozygous merles can be deaf or blind, or express iris colobomas, retinal detachment, cataracts, persistent pupillary membrane, a displacement of the lens, equatorial staphyloma, night blindness and microphthalmia. Audio impairment or deafness usually develops after the birth of a puppy with their ear canal still closed. The white color of double merles is produced due to the lack of melanocytes which provide high potassium levels in the endolymph surrounding the cochlea's hair cells. There is no surgery or treatment that can reduce the damage. Loss of hearing is directly linked to the amount of pigmentation cells a dog has. The same pigment that is lacking in the ear can also be lacking in the eyes, affecting its development. Although many believe that only dogs with blue eyes have eye problems, it is not correct. Due to the contrast between eye problems and blue eyes, eye conditions in blue-eyed dogs are much easier to spot.

The term "lethal white" originated from horses born with lethal white syndrome, and has since evolved to often describe dogs born with the double merle trait. This trait is found in many breeds, but most commonly found in Australian Shepherds. The name "lethal white" is a misnomer, as this genetic condition is not lethal to the dogs; it is often the breeder who is lethal to the pups by culling them immediately after birth. Many consider the term "lethal white" to be derogatory.

== Activities ==
Like other herding breeds, these dogs excel at many dog sports, especially herding also known as stockdog, dog agility, dock diving/dock jumping, obedience, rally, tracking, disc, and flyball. Herding instincts and trainability can be measured at noncompetitive instinct tests. Australian Shepherds that exhibit basic herding instincts can be trained to compete in ASCA stock dog trials or AKC herding events.

The dog has a stride in which its front and back legs cross over, making for an appearance of "on the edge" speed. The dogs instinctively use a "pounce" position to deal with cattle trying to kick them. They also have strong hips and legs, allowing for fast acceleration and high jumping, sometimes as high as 4 ft (1.3 m).

An Australian shepherd named Pockets is credited as being the oldest dog to earn a title in AKC history, having earned the Rally Novice title at the age of 15 years, 5 weeks.

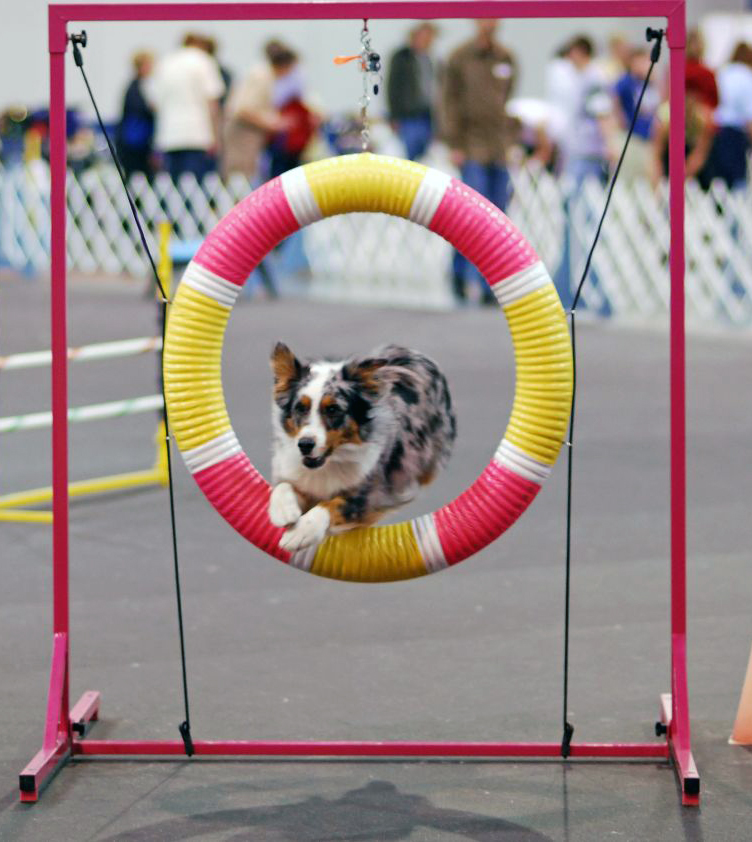
A blue merle in a dog agility competition

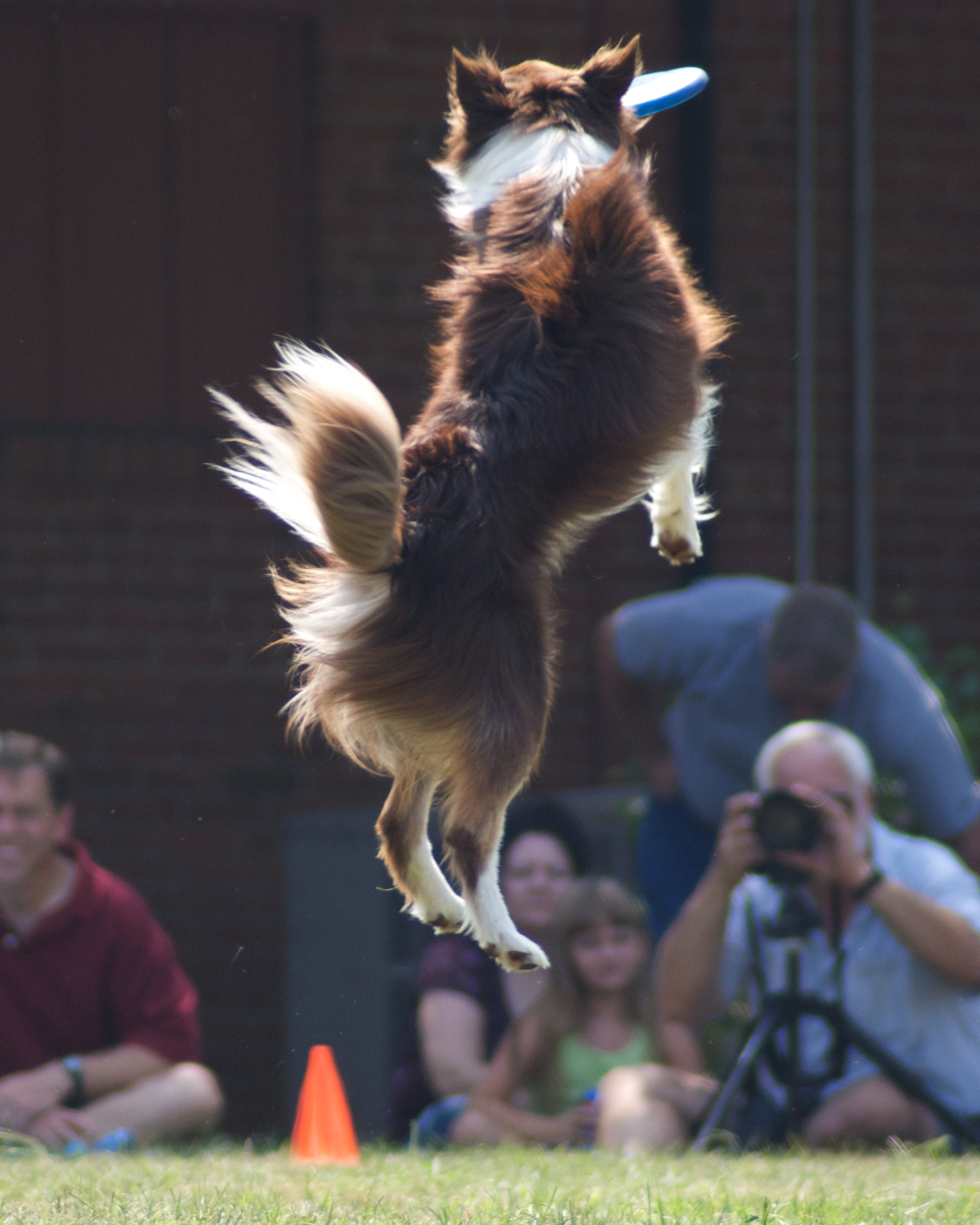
Australian Shepherd catching a frisbee

== See also ==
- List of dog breeds
