= Merle (dog coat) =

Genetic pattern in a dog's coat

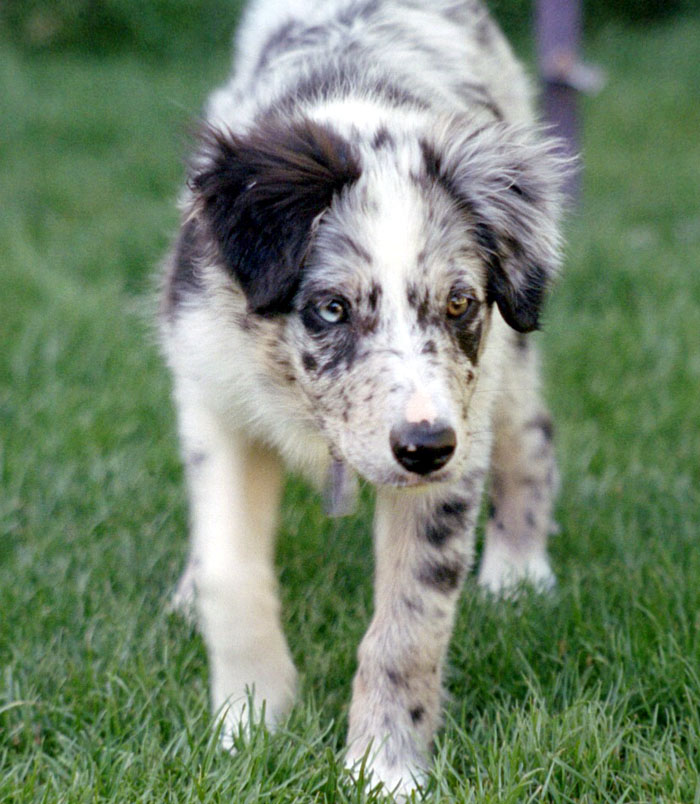
Blue merle Border Collie puppy with odd-colored eyes

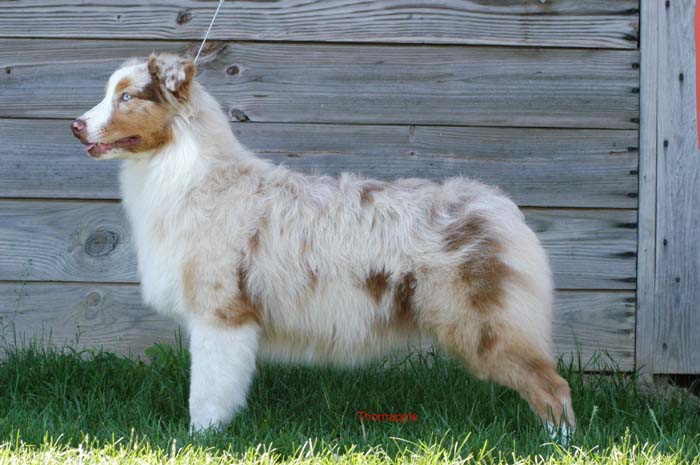
Red merle Australian Shepherd

Merle is a genetic pattern in a dog's coat and alleles of the PMEL gene. It results in different colors and patterns and can affect any coats. The allele creates mottled patches of color in a solid or piebald coat, blue or odd-colored eyes, and can affect skin pigment as well. Two types of colored patches generally appear in a merle coat: brown/liver (red merle) and black (blue merle). Associated breeds include Carea Leonés, Australian Shepherds and Catahoula Leopard Dogs. Health issues are more typical and more severe when two merle-patterned dogs are bred together.

== Description ==
Merle can affect all coat colors. The merle forms of brown are usually called "red" (though this is not correct; red and brown are genetically different), and black is called "blue" as lighter patches of black are formed throughout the coat and look slightly blue in color. Dogs who are recessive red can still be affected by merle, but the patches are either hardly seen or, if the dog is a clear recessive red, are not visible at all. Combinations such as brindle and sable merle exist, but are not typically accepted in breed standards.

In addition to altering the base coat color, merle also modifies eye color and coloring on the nose and paw pads. The merle allele modifies the dark pigment, resulting in eyes or parts of eyes turning blue. Since merle causes random modifications, dark-eyed, blue-eyed and odd-colored eyes are possible. Pigmentation on paw pads and nose may be mottled by pink.

== Breeds ==
Dapple Miniature Dachshund

Merle is a distinguishing marking of several breeds, particularly the Australian Shepherd, Australian Cattle Dog, and Catahoula Leopard Dog, and appears in others, including the Miniature American Shepherd, the Koolie in Australia, the Shetland Sheepdog, various collie breeds, the Cardigan Welsh Corgi, the Pyrenean Shepherd and the Bergamasco Shepherd. In Dachshunds, the merle pattern is known as "dapple". In Beaucerons the merle pattern is known as "harlequin".

The merle allele also plays a part in producing harlequin Great Danes. Depending on the breed, registry or country, the pattern may be register-able with a registry but not allowed in conformation, and the pattern may not be recognized by the breed standard, disqualifying it from showing. There may also be additional requirements for the pattern such as the dog being allowed to have the pattern but must have completely dark eyes with no blue in them.

Merle is sometimes introduced to other purebred dog breeds through crossbreeding such as French Bulldogs, poodles and even American Bullies, but these dogs are not purebred. In 2020 the UK Kennel Club (the oldest in the world) banned the registration of merle poodles as it is not and never has been a colour pattern recognised in pure poodles by the club.. The Pembroke Welsh Corgi Club of America states that the only accepted Pembroke colors are red, sable, fawn, and black and tan, with or without white markings, and that "brindle and merle in either red or blue are NOT naturally occurring or accepted colors for Pembroke Welsh Corgis."

== Genetic basis ==
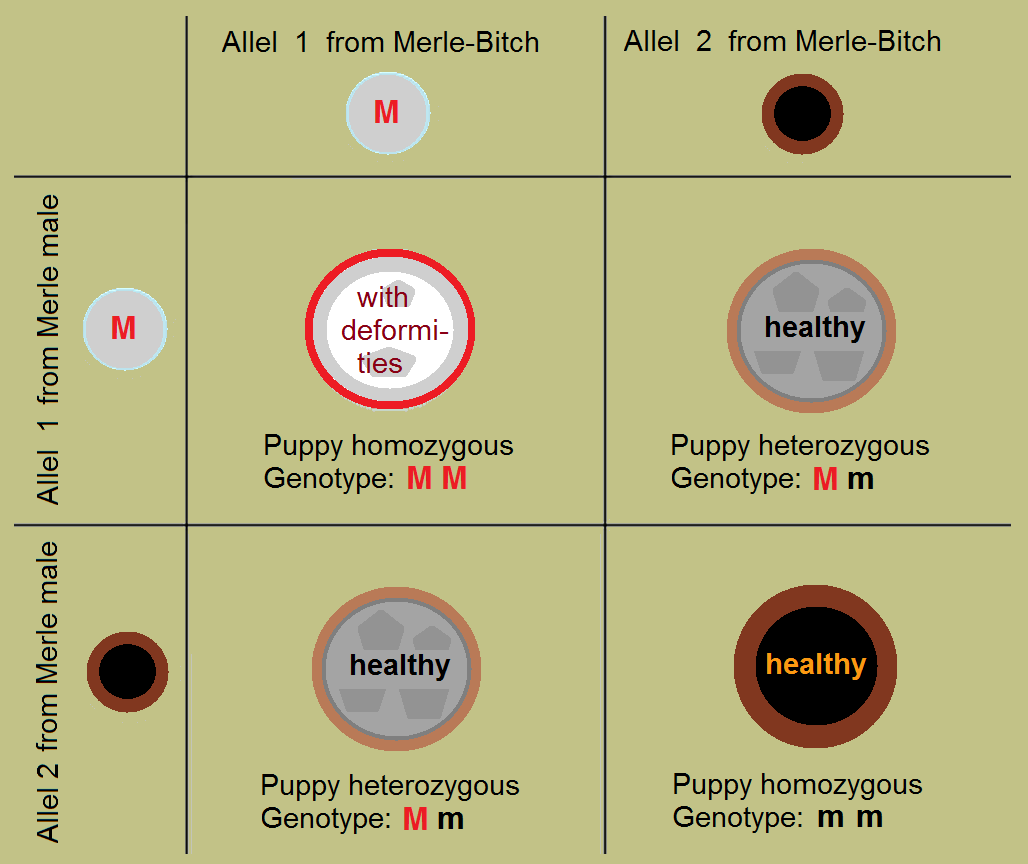
Punnett square showing potential consequences of breeding two merle dogs together

The merle allele is actually an incompletely dominant allele, and all dogs with standard merle coats are heterozygous, having only one copy of the merle allele. In normal breeding of a merle (Mm) and a non-merle (mm) dog, approximately half of puppies are expected to be merle.

Merle can be tested for and identified through genetic testing.

In 2006, scientists announced the discovery of a mobile genetic unit called a retrotransposon responsible for the various merle mutations in dogs.

In 2018, a published paper identified six general categories of merle alleles that affect (or do not affect) the final coat color depending on the length of the SINE insertion within them.

=== Double merles ===
If two heterozygote merle dogs (Mm) are mated, on average one quarter of the puppies will be born with two merle alleles (MM). These homozygous dogs are often called "double merles", or more rarely "lethal whites". These dogs may be entirely white, or present with predominantly white coats with some small patches of other colors.

A high percentage of double merle dogs have eye defects or are deaf. Because of these health issues, merle to merle mating is avoided by breeders.

=== Cryptic merles ===
A cryptic merle is one with such small patches of merling, or none at all, that it appears to be a non-merle. This is commonly seen in dogs who are recessive red, clear recessive reds in particular, though patches can still be seen in certain red dogs. In America, a dog with the phantom merle coloring is sometimes described as being "cryptic for merle". A cryptic merle bred to a merle may produce merles, cryptic merles, double merles or non-merles, depending on whether the parents were heterozygous or homozygous for the merle alleles. Another mutation for cryptic merle has been identified by Dr. Helena Synková, and has been given the working name of "atypical merle". It is recommended that if a breeder is unsure if their dog is merle or not, that they be tested for the merle allele lengths.

=== Modifiers ===
Certain modifying genes work in tandem (co-dominant expressive) with the merle alleles to create a completely different look to the pattern.

Often mistaken for a "double merle", a harlequin merle (or just harlequin), is a Great Dane that carries both the merle pattern allele and the co-dominant modifying gene for harlequin, PSMB7 (also known as H). This causes most or all of the diluted "blue" color to be replaced with white, resulting in a dog that is mostly white with black patches. All dogs exhibiting the harlequin pattern also have the merle allele. This pattern is found only in Great Danes, and is registered as harlequin.

== Health issues ==
Studies have shown that dogs with merle genotypes are disproportionately predisposed to health issues, and especially with their hearing and eyesight. This relationship is likely due to the inherent suppression of melanin-producing cells (melanocytes), and their role in the development of the iris and of the inner ear (see Melanin § Genetic disorders and disease states and Albinism § Consequences).

Dogs with two copies of the merle allele (homozygous "double merles") have a higher probability of having hearing or vision impairments.

The UK Royal Kennel Club acknowledged the health risks associated with homozygous merles and stopped registering puppies produced from merle to merle matings in 2013.

An auditory-pigmentation disorder in humans, Waardenburg syndrome, reflects some of the problems associated with homozygous merle dogs and genetic research in dogs has been undertaken with the goal of better understanding the genetic basis of this human condition.

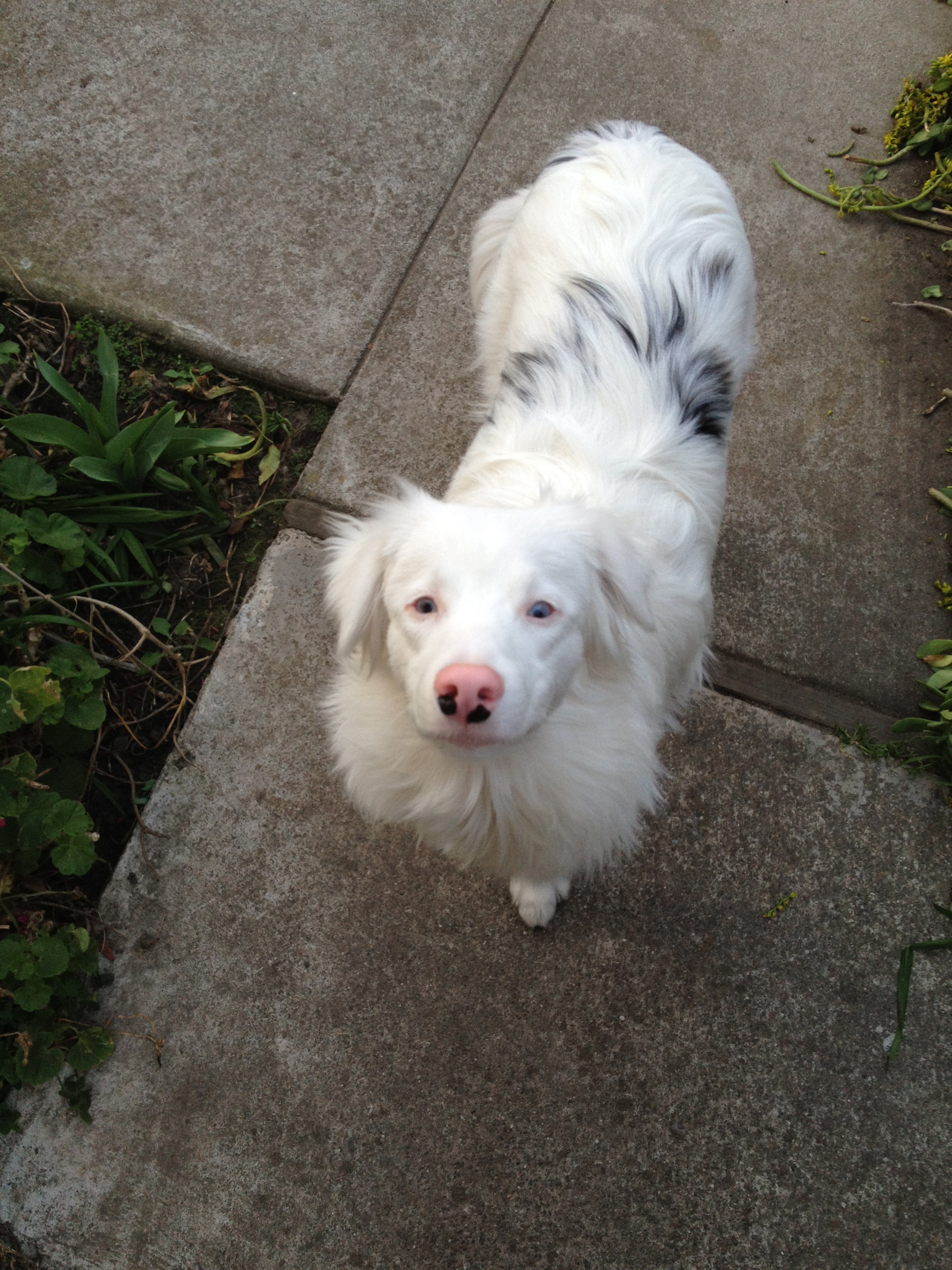
A deaf eight-month-old homozygous merle Australian Shepherd. She has blue eyes with starburst pupils and an eccentric pupil in her left eye.

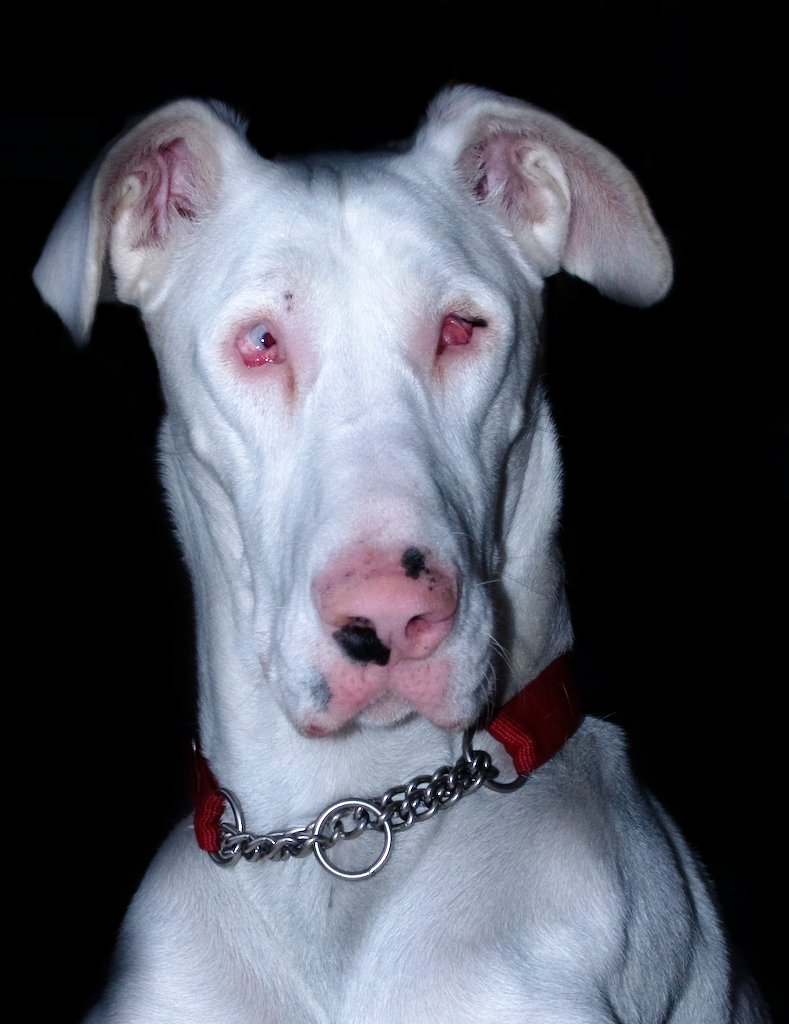
A Great Dane mix homozygous for merle displaying bilateral microphthalmia

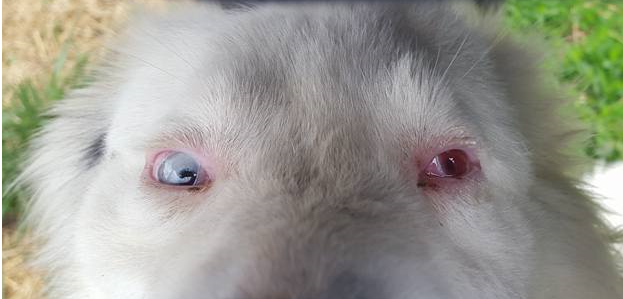
An Australian Shepherd homozygous for merle

=== Auditory defects ===
A 1977 study in dachshunds found that 36.8% of merle (Mm) and 54.6% of double merle (MM) dogs had mild to severe deafness, while a comparison non-merle group had no similar defects. One out of the eleven double merles (9.1%) was fully deaf in both ears, while none of the single merles were. This study has been criticized for its outsized impact on considerations of all merle dogs while relying on data from inbred animals of a single breed.

A later unpublished study of 70 Shetland sheepdogs, Australian shepherds, collies, Great Danes and Catahoula leopard dogs found that of 22 double merles, eight were completely deaf (36%) and two were deaf in one ear (9%). Of 48 single merles, one was deaf in one ear and none were completely deaf. Of those double merle dogs, the Catahoulas showed lower rates of deafness than other breeds (27% to 86%).

A 2006 study of deafness in border collies predicted deafness in 7.9% of merle coated border collies (with a potential prevalence of 13.3%; 95% confidence limit). The authors also noted that blue eyes and excess white on the head were strong indicators for deafness in the breed (9.3% prevalence for one blue eye and 23.9% for two blue eyes; 36.3% prevalence for excess white).

Finally a 2009 study in 153 merle and double merle dogs of various breeds demonstrated unilateral deafness in 2.7% and bilateral deafness in 0.9% of single merles (Mm), and unilateral deafness in 10% and bilateral deafness in 15% of double merles (MM).

=== Ocular defects ===
Dogs who are homozygous for certain merle alleles often have visual and auditory deficits. Ocular defects include microphthalmia, conditions causing increased ocular pressure and colobomas, among others. Double merle dogs may be deaf or blind or both, and can carry ocular defects in blue or colored eyes. Currently no studies have been done to prove whether or not the merle gene affects the eyes, causing blindness.

== See also ==
- List of dog coat patterns
