= Linear atrophoderma of Moulin =

- Other names: Moulin atrophoderma linearis, atrophoderma of Moulin
- Specialty: Dermatology

Linear atrophoderma of Moulin, also known as Moulin atrophoderma linearis,) is an acquired unilateral dermatitis localized along the Blaschko lines. It affects children or adolescents of both genders, involving the trunk and the limbs. It is, presumably, a rare cutaneous form of mosaicism. This disease was first referred to as atrophoderma of Moulin after Dr. Moulin who first reported it in 1992 then was renamed as linear atrophoderma of Moulin. Only a few dozen cases have been described; for this reason, LAM is considered to be a very rare disorder.

== See also ==
- Atrophoderma of Pasini and Pierini
- List of cutaneous conditions
