= Kraissl's lines =

Anatomical skin lines

Kraissl's lines are a set of anatomical skin lines. They differ from Langer's lines in that, unlike Langer's lines, which are defined in term of collagen orientation, Kraissl's lines are the lines of maximum skin tension.

Whereas Langer's lines were defined in cadavers, Kraissl's lines have been defined in living individuals by using the skin's natural wrinkles and folds as a guide to the orientation of skin tension. Kraissl's mapping method also had the benefit of being non-traumatic and addressed concerns about possible differences between living bodies and cadavers.

== See also ==
- Blaschko's lines
- Langer's lines
- Relaxed Skin Tension Lines
