= Cardigan Welsh Corgi =

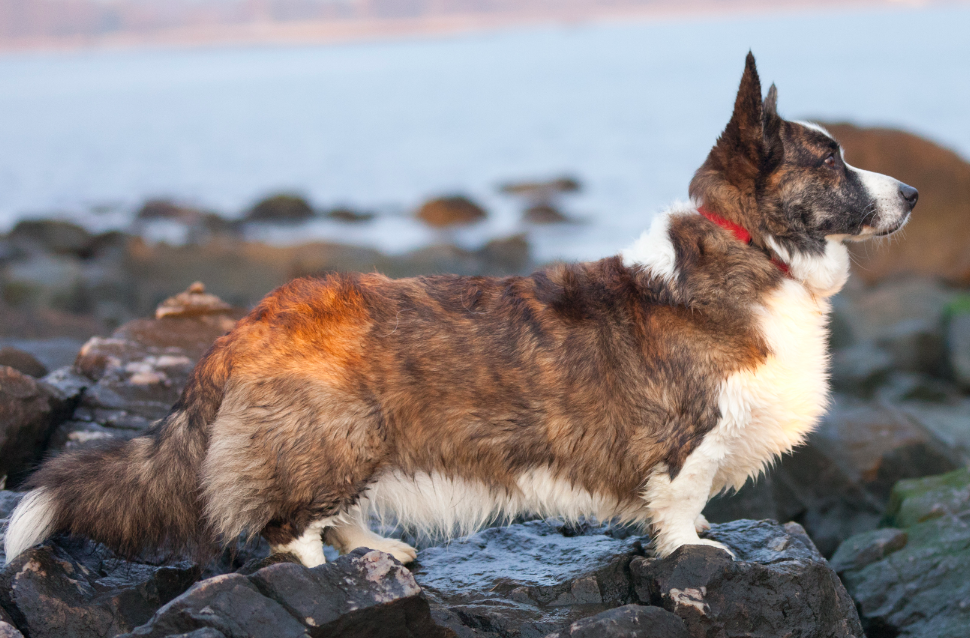
- Brindle and white Cardigan Welsh Corgi
- Common nicknames: Cardigan; CWC; Cardi
- Origin: Wales
Kennel club standards
- The Kennel Club: standard
- Fédération Cynologique Internationale: standard

The Cardigan Welsh Corgi (/ˈkɔːrɡi/; Welsh for "dwarf dog") is one of two different varieties of livestock-herding dog breeds known as Welsh Corgis (originating in Wales), with the other being the Pembroke Welsh Corgi. It is one of the oldest breeds of the British Isles. Cardigan Welsh corgis are known to be an extremely loyal and trainable dog breed, naturally attuned to herding many different animals, from poultry and waterfowl to large livestock such as sheep and cattle. They are also versatile and can live in a variety of settings.

== History ==
Pembroke Welsh and Cardigan Welsh Corgis were both originally listed as one breed by The Kennel Club (UK) in 1925; the two varieties were officially recognized as distinct from one another by The Kennel Club by 1928, but were still categorized together under the title of "Welsh Corgis". In 1934, due to judge preferences towards each breed separately, the two breeds were finally described as uniquely different and shown separately at dog shows. The official name was changed from Corgi (Welsh) to Cardigan Welsh Corgi in 2006. The Corgi Club was founded in December 1925 in Carmarthen, South Wales. It was reported that the local members favoured the Pembroke corgis, so a club for Cardigan enthusiasts was founded a year later in 1926. Both groups have worked hard to ensure the appearance and type of breed are standardised, through careful and selective breeding.

One theory, regarding the breed’s origin, is that both types of corgi descended from a line of northern, spitz-type dogs; a second theory is that they descended from the teckel family of dogs, which also is where the dachshund originated.

The word "corgi" is derived from the Welsh: cor gi, which means "dwarf dog". The breed was formerly called "yard-long dog" (Welsh: ci-llathed). The name "Cardigan Welsh corgi" name comes from their area of origin in Wales, Cardigan (Welsh 'Ceredigion') (and not from their coat markings which may vaguely resemble a "cardigan" worn by the dog). It was brought to the US for the first time in June of 1931.

== Description ==
The Cardigan is a long, low dog with upright ears and a fox brush tail.

Originally used only as a farm guardian, they eventually took on the traits of a cattle drover, herder, and many more. They are still highly valued for their herding, working, and guarding skills, as well as their companionship. The old American Kennel Club standard called it an "Alsatian on short legs". The Cardigan's tail is long (unlike the Pembroke Welsh Corgi, whose tail may be long, naturally bobbed or docked). The Cardigan is also larger than the Pembroke.

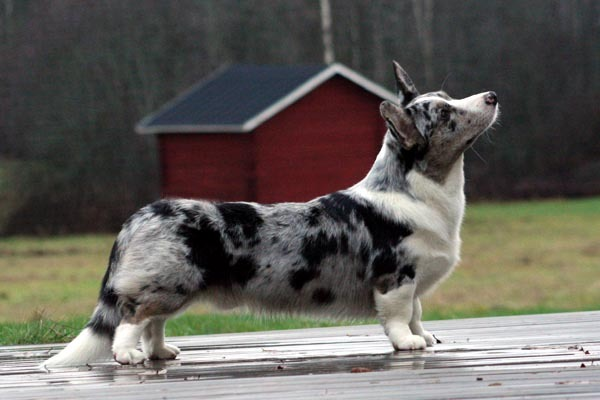
Blue merle Cardigan

Cardigans, which are double coated, come in a variety of colors including any shade of red, sable, or brindle, as well as black, with or without tan, brindle or blue merle (a rare breed due to the challenges with breeding), with or without tan or brindle points. The Blue Merle coat, unique to the larger and more relaxed Cardigan Welsh Corgis, is characterized by black or grey speckles or marbling and pale blue or uniquely colored eyes. Other unofficial colors can occur, such as red merle, but these colors are not considered acceptable per the Cardigan standard. They usually have white on the neck, chest, legs, muzzle, underneath, tip of the tail and as a blaze on the head, known as the "Irish pattern". Other markings include ticking on the legs and muzzle, smutty muzzles and monk's hoods, especially on sables (a pattern of darker tipped hairs over a basic red coat color.). An average Cardigan is around 10 to 13 inches (250 to 330 mm) tall at the withers and weighs from 30 to 38 pounds (14 to 17 kg) for the male and 25 to 34 pounds (11 to 15 kg) for the female.

== Breeding ==
Male corgis can breed at any time throughout the year. While female corgis have different mating periods, they typically breed twice a year. They can conceive for about 21 days during each cycle, referred to as being "in heat." Pregnancy lasts about two months, and the female can have a small or large litter of puppies, a process known as whelping. Newborn puppies are blind and deaf at birth, but begin to see after 10 days and hear after three weeks. Their first teeth emerge in two to three weeks, and they are weaned off milk after six weeks. By four to six months, adult teeth replace their baby teeth and they reach full maturity at two years old.

== Health ==
A 2024 UK study found a life expectancy of 13.1 years for the breed compared to an average of 12.7 for purebreeds and 12 for crossbreeds.

The most common causes of death in a 2004 Kennel Club survey were cancer (28.3%), old age (24.6%), and neurological disorders (15.2%).

Canine Intervertebral Disc Disease (IVDD) is known to occur in the Cardigan Welsh Corgi. This is likely due to the Cardigan being a dwarf (chondrodysplastic) breed, and these breeds frequently suffer from Type I disk disease. This disease is commonly found in the Dachshund breed.

The Cardigan Welsh Corgi can also inherit a vision disorder known as Progressive Retinal Atrophy, with cases discovered in Australia, USA, UK and the Netherlands.

== Temperament ==
The Cardigan Welsh Corgi has a relaxed personality and tend to be less social. While they are cautious around strangers, their personality comes out when they become comfortable and playful.

Cardigan Welsh Corgis compete in dog agility trials, obedience, showmanship, flyball, and tracking events. Herding instincts and trainability can be measured at noncompetitive herding tests. Corgis exhibiting basic herding instincts can be trained to compete in herding trials. These same herding instincts can show when around running children, this behavior must be coached to avoid nipping. Cardigan Welsh Corgis see themselves as part of a pack, similar to wild dogs. They view humans as fellow pack members, so at home, corgis establish their place within the family and other pets, acknowledging humans as the leaders.

- Cardigans are highly intelligent, active, athletic dogs.
- Housepet: They have proven themselves as excellent companion animals. Cardigans are affectionate and devoted.
- Competitive in sheepdog trials, dog agility, competitive obedience and rally obedience.
- Guard Dogs: Capable as guard dogs in spite of their small size.
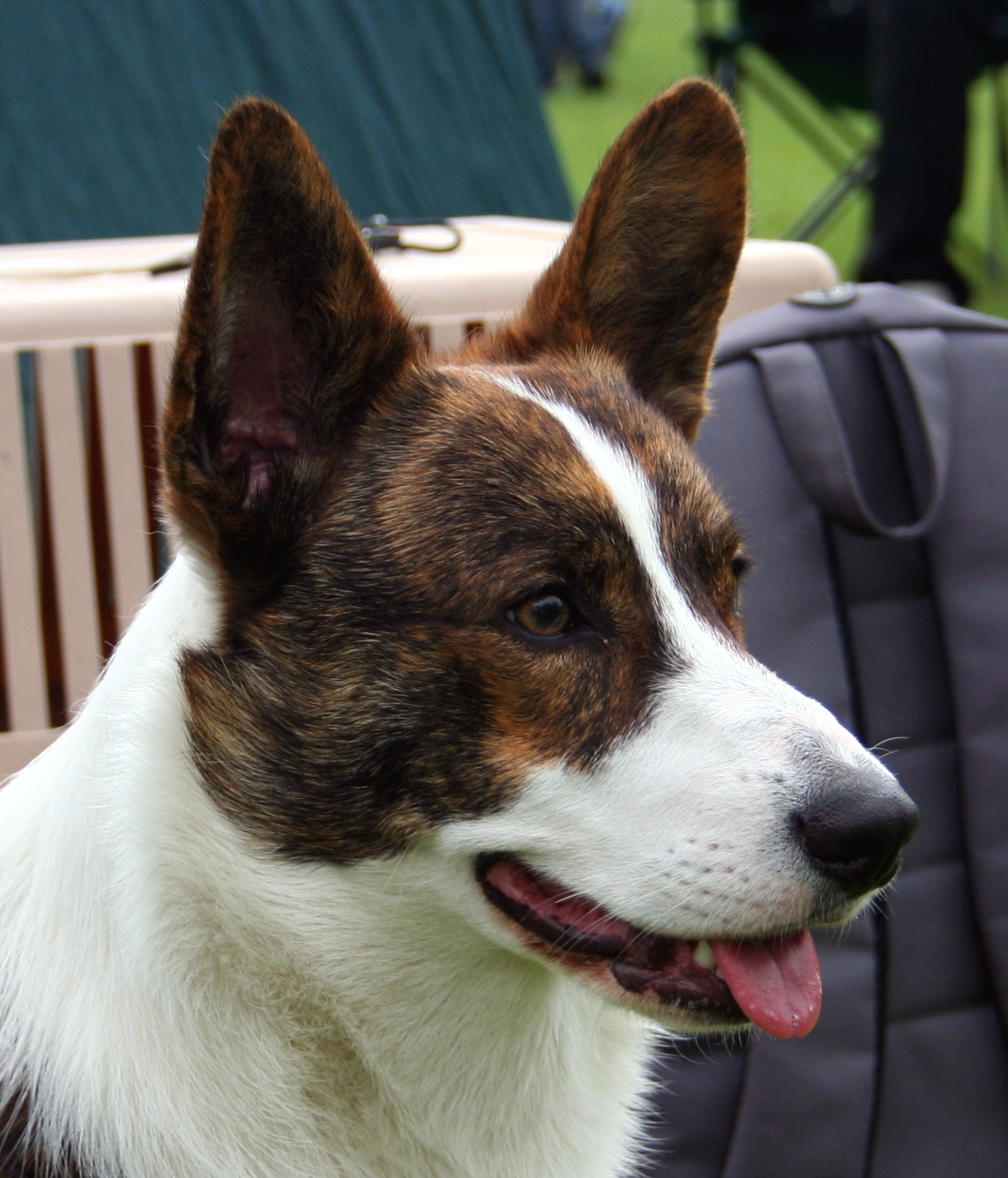

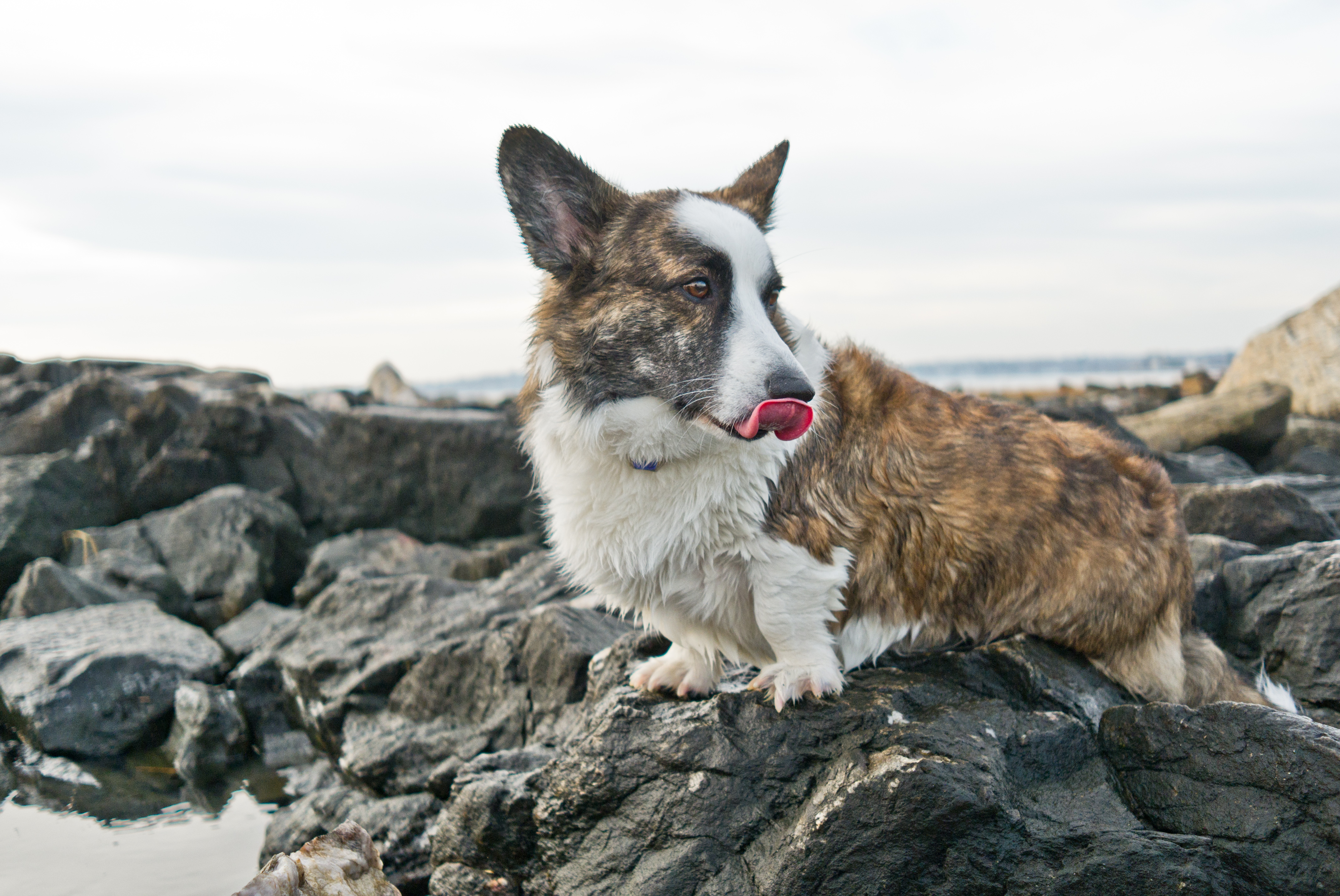

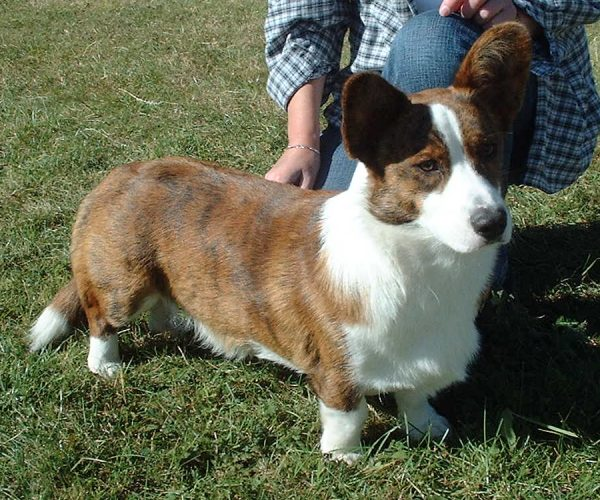

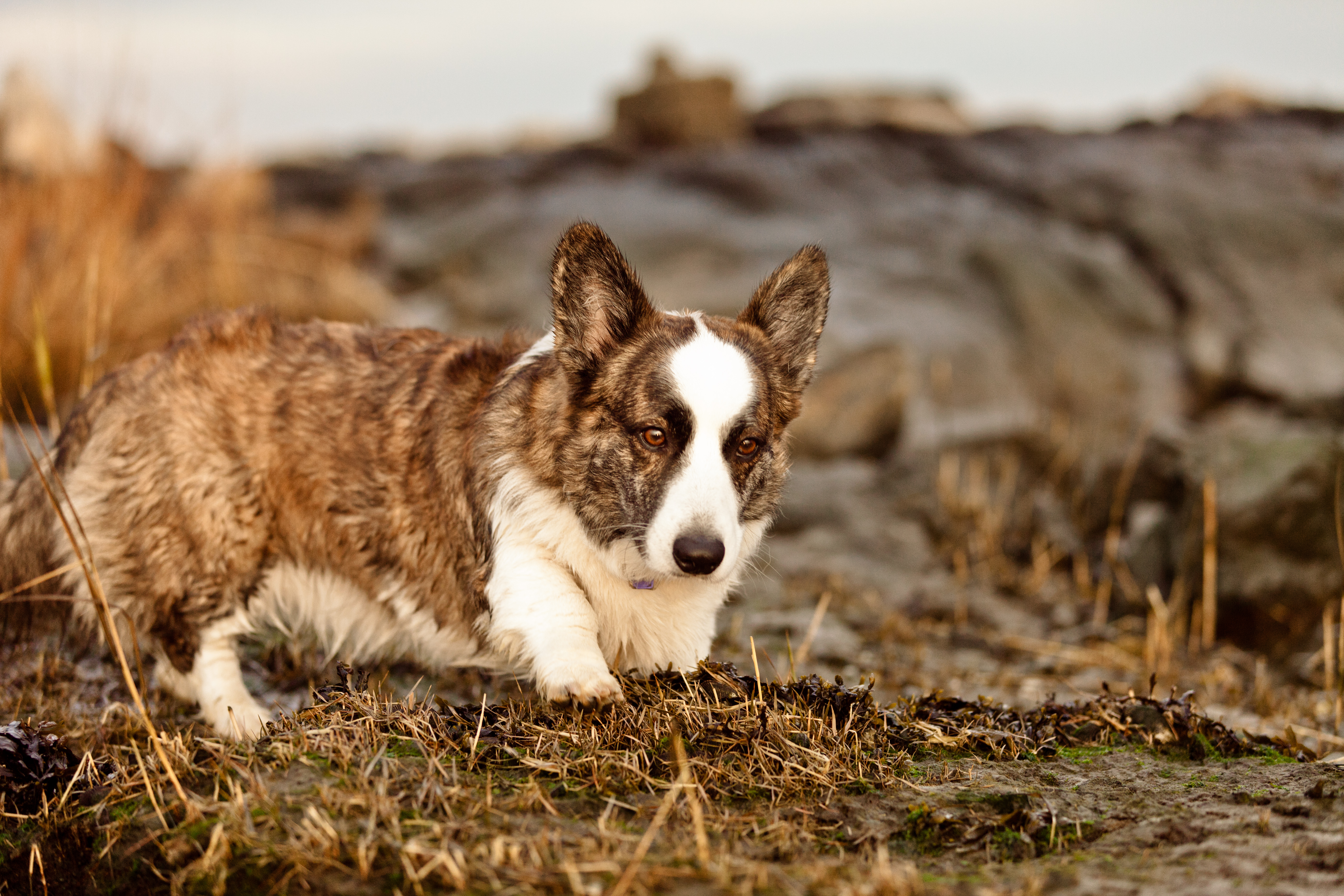

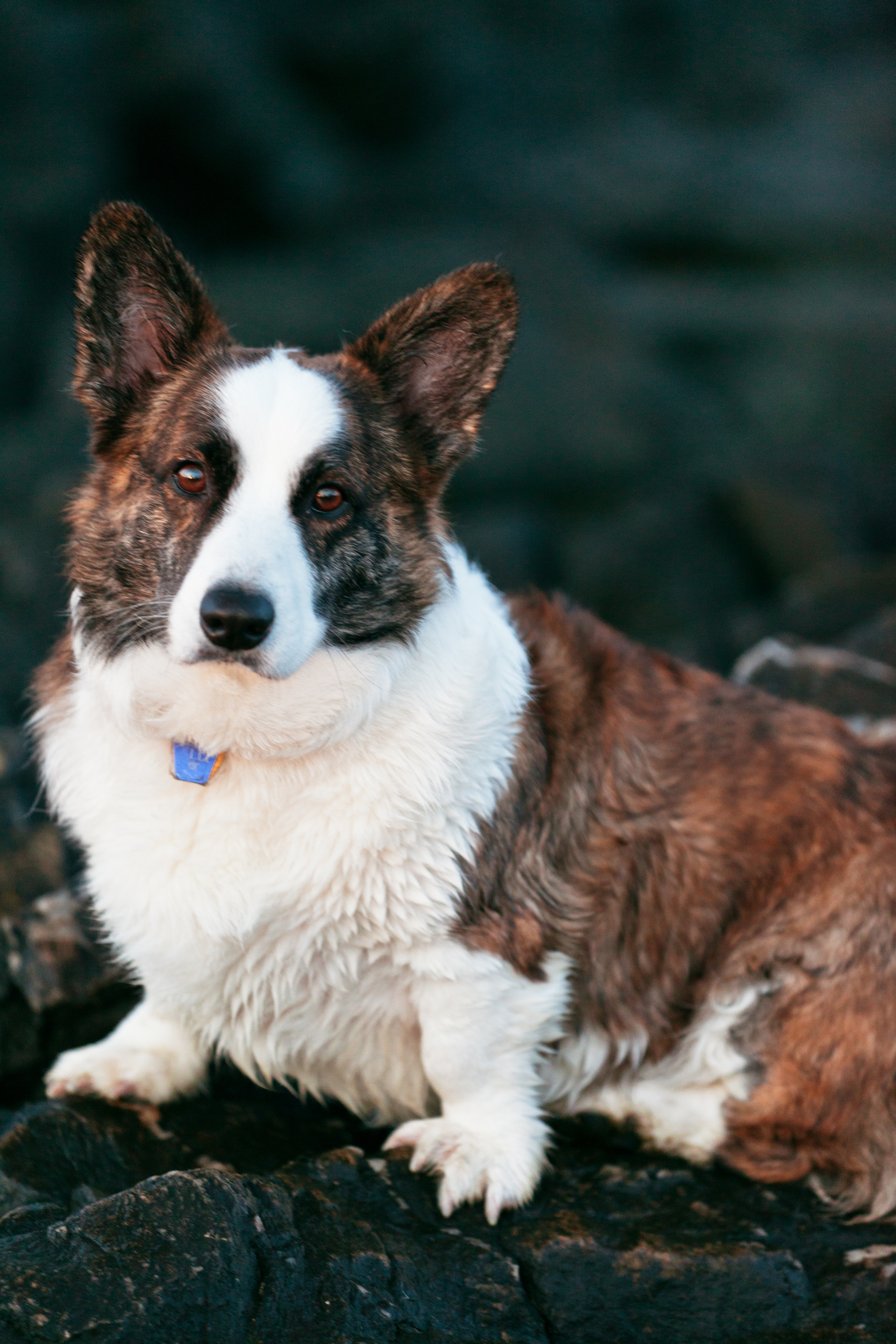

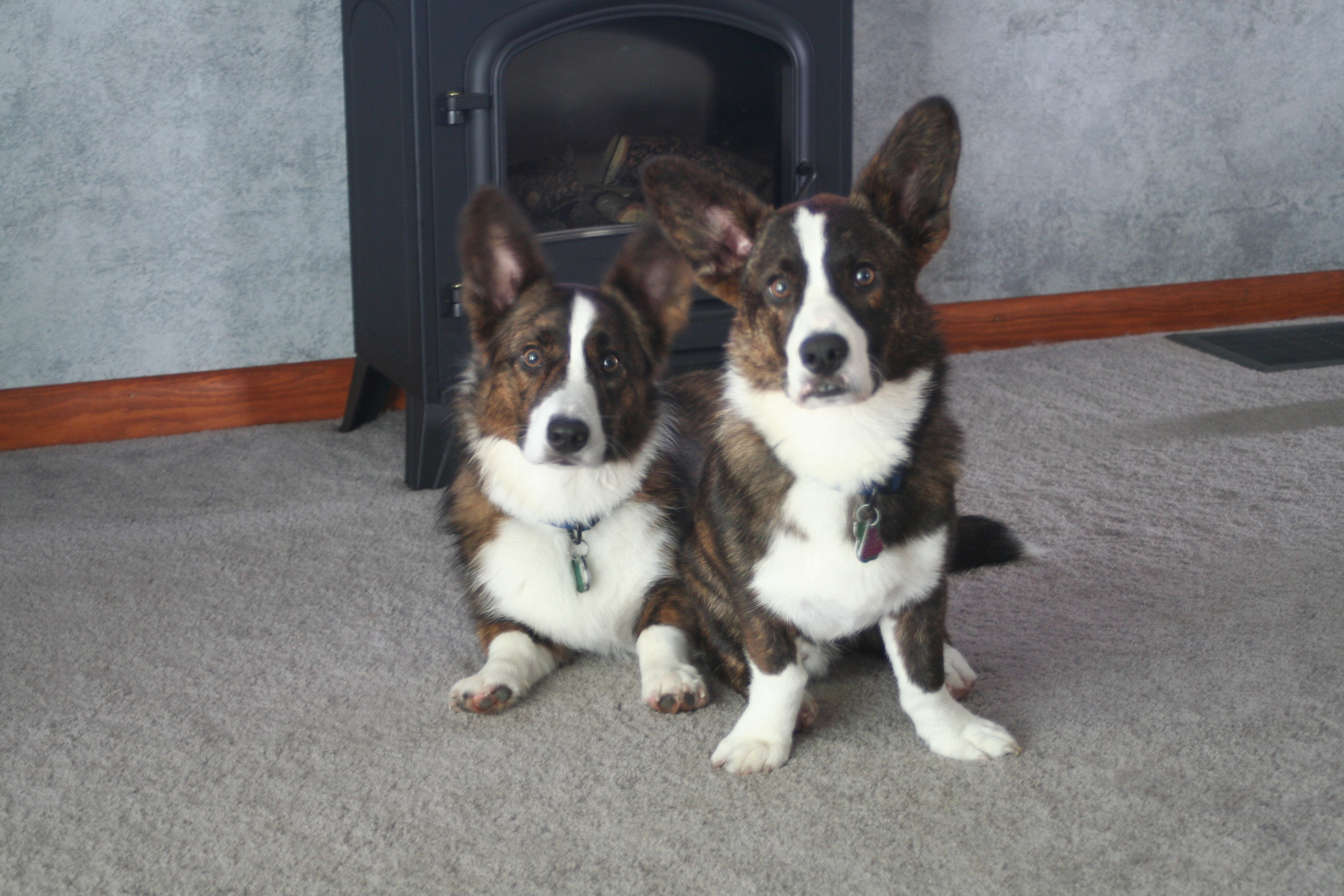

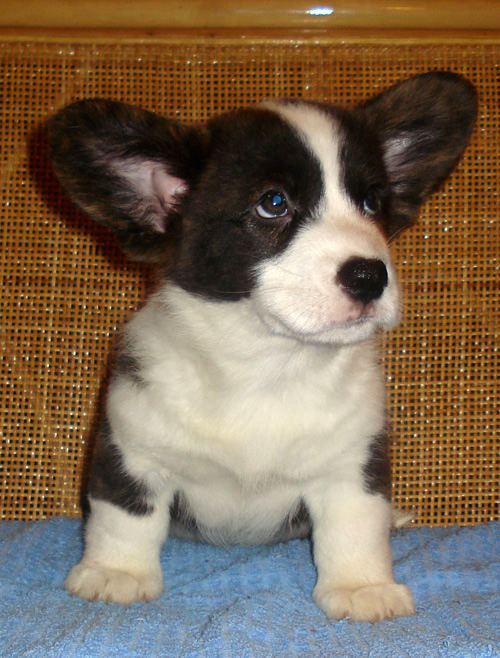

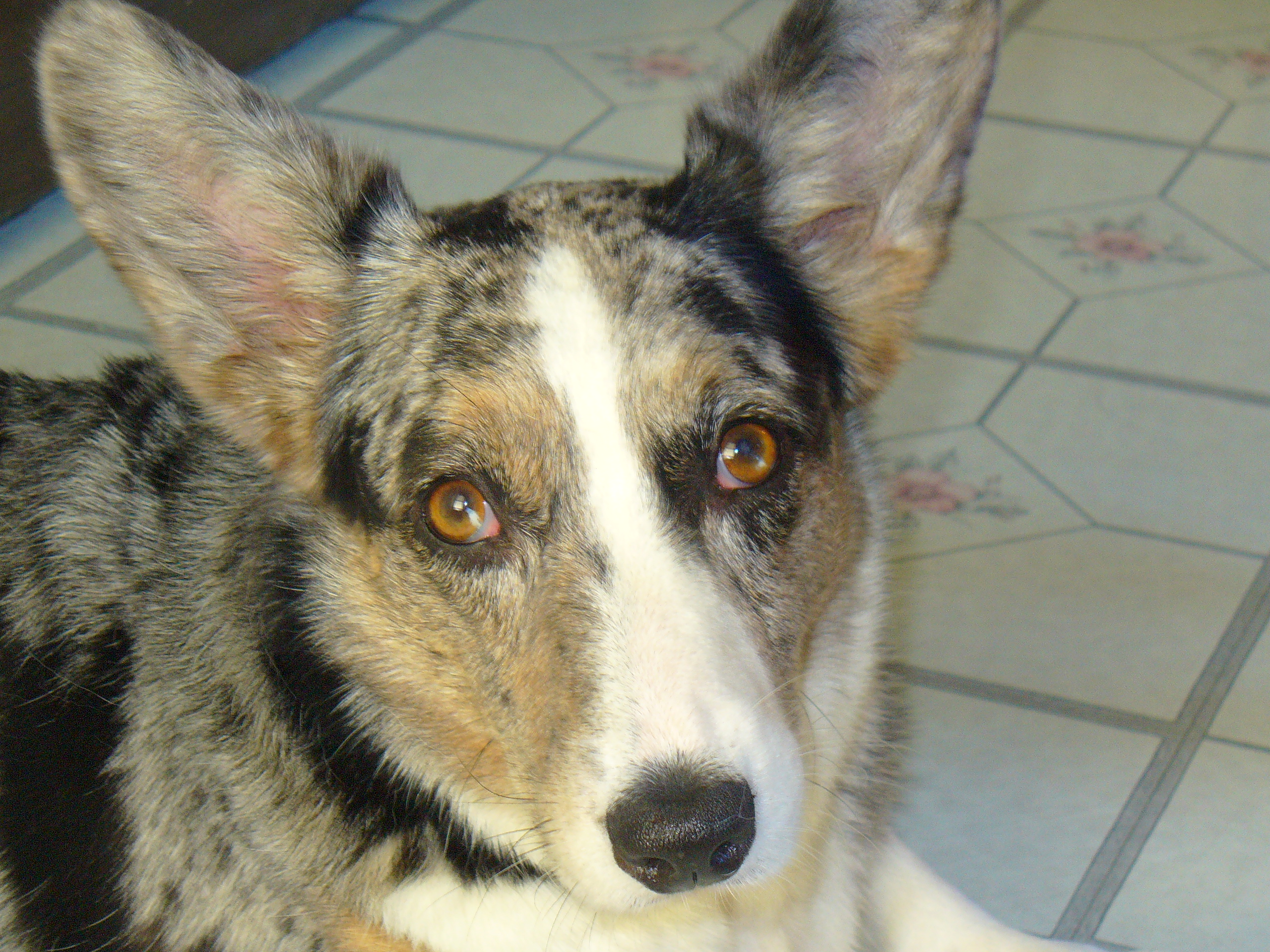

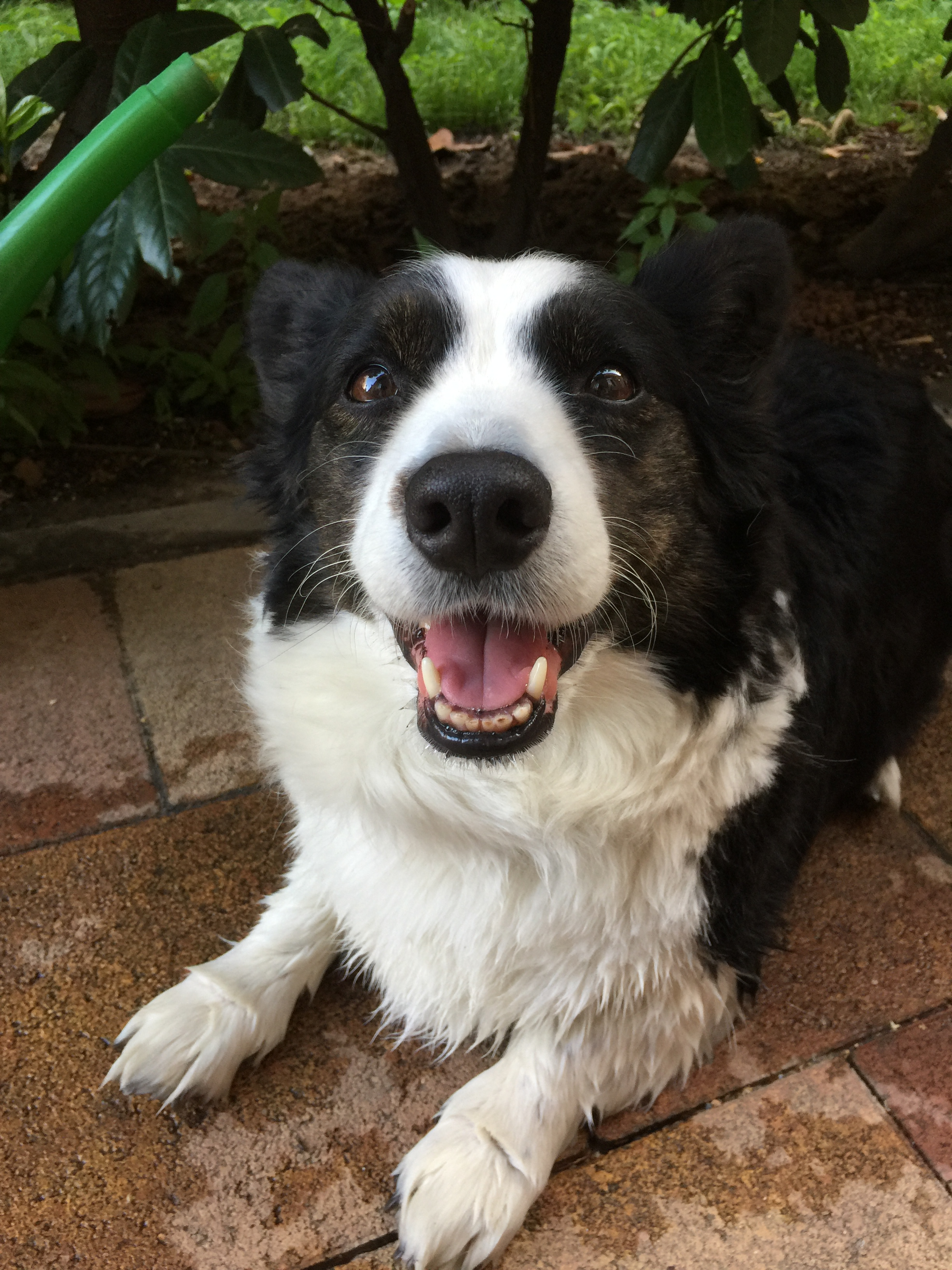

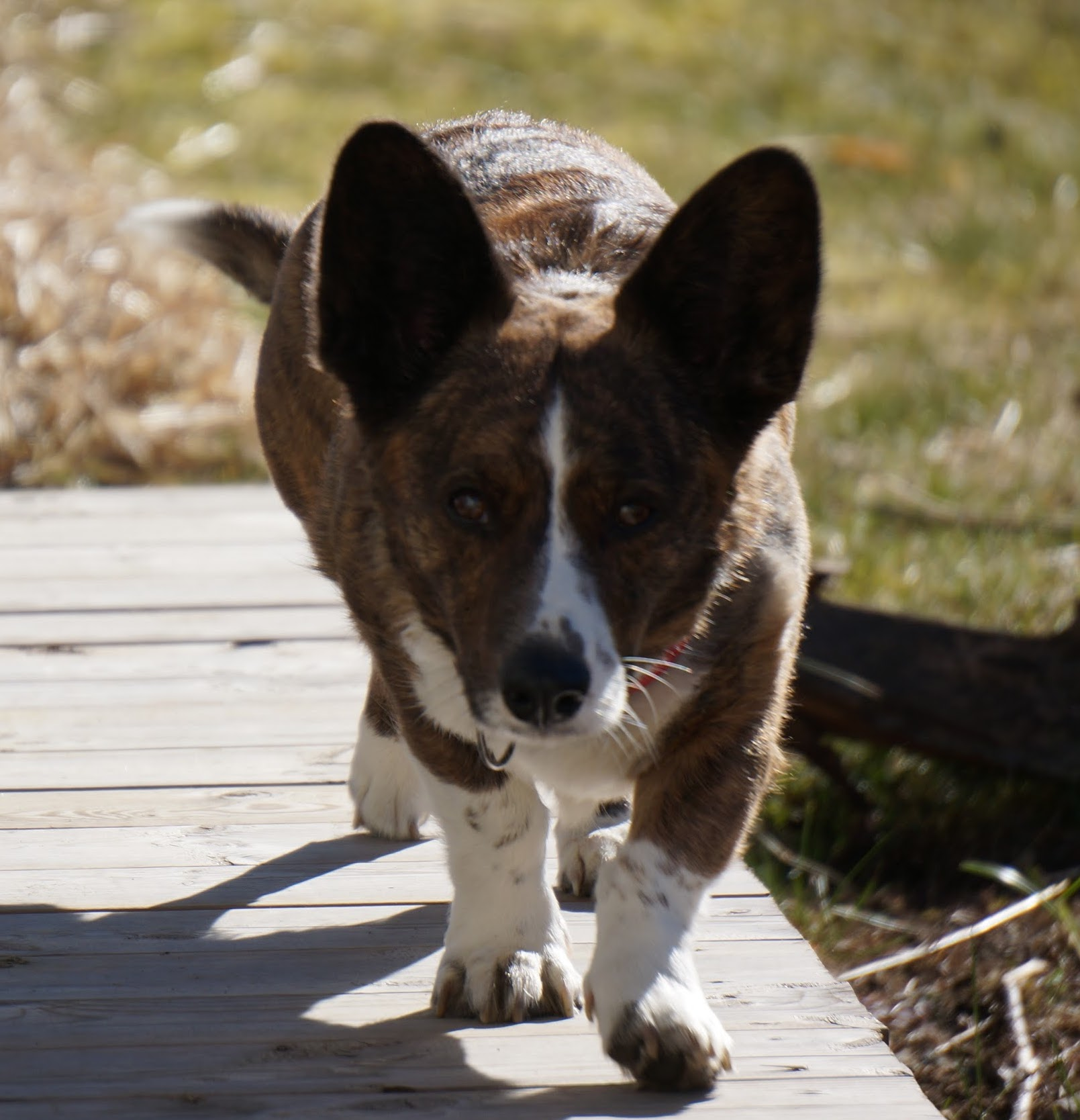

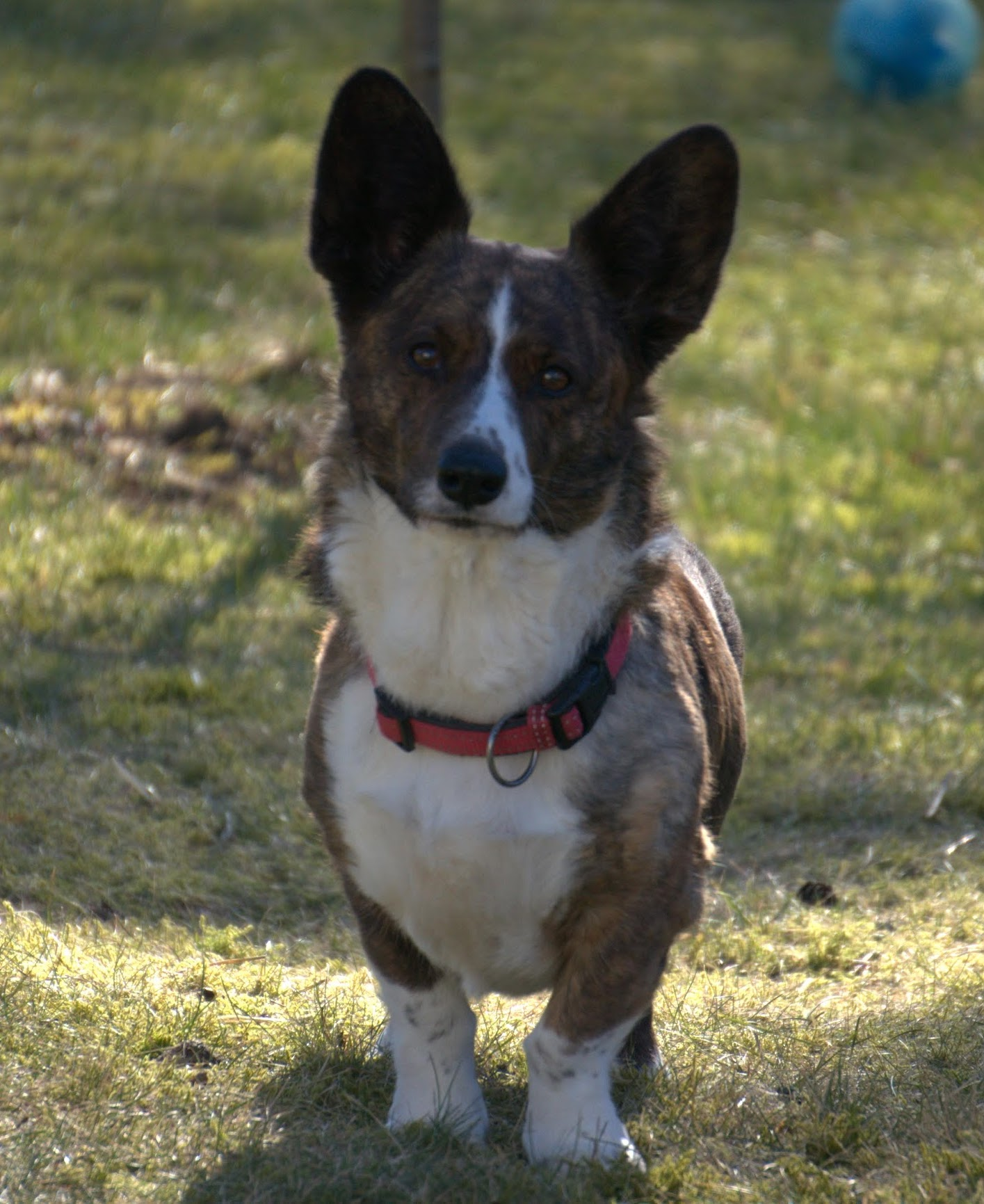

== See also ==
- List of dog breeds
