= Langer's lines =

Topological lines of collagen fibers' orientation in the dermis

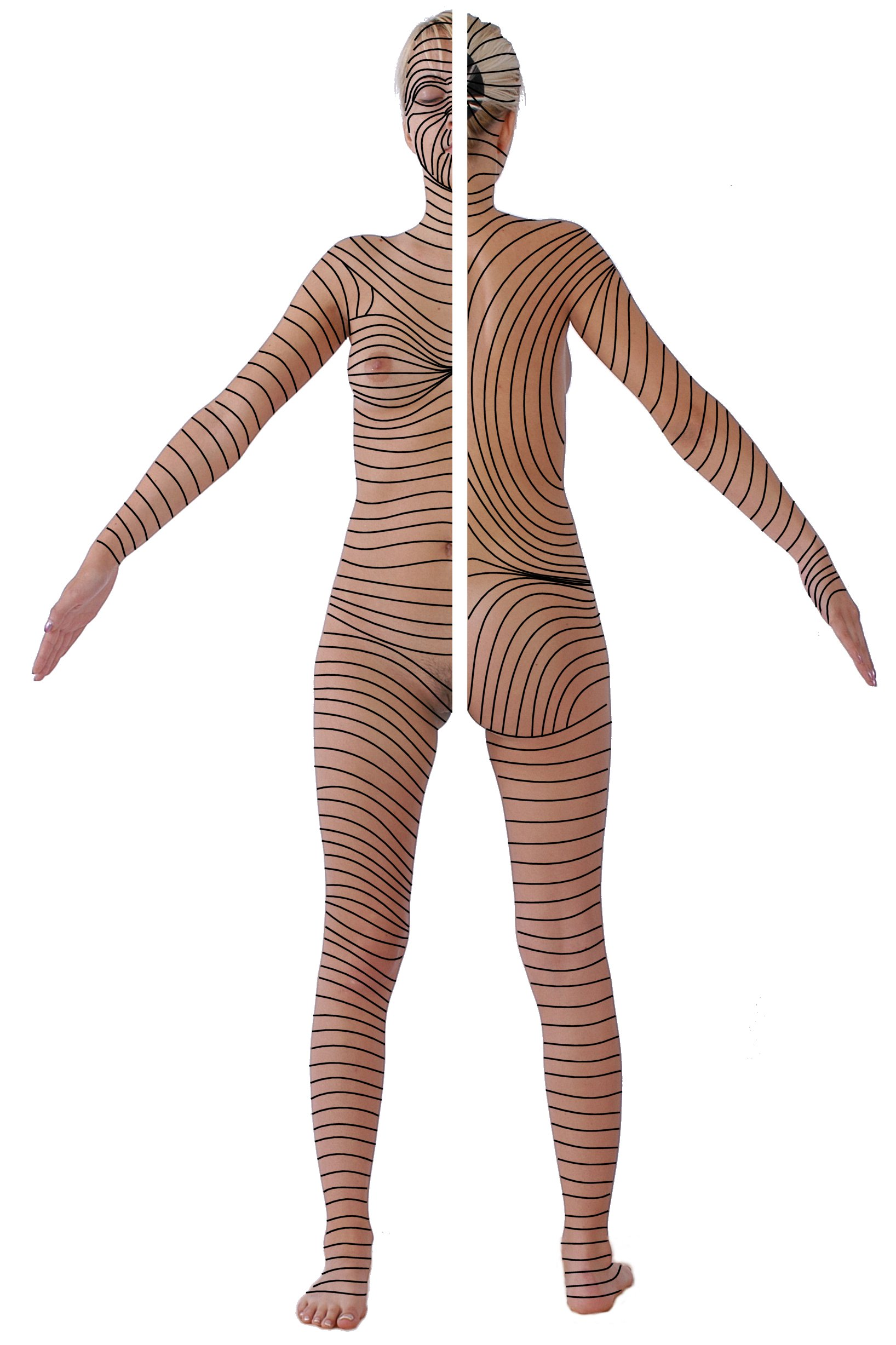

Identifiers
- TA98: A16.0.00.008
- TA2: 7045
- FMA: 71951

Langer's lines, Langer lines of skin tension, or sometimes called cleavage lines, are topological skin lines drawn on a map of the human body. They are parallel to the natural orientation of collagen fibers in the dermis, and generally parallel to the underlying muscle fibers. Langer's lines have relevance to forensic science and the development of surgical techniques.

== History ==
The lines were first discovered in 1861 by Austrian anatomist Karl Langer (1819–1887), though he cited the surgeon Baron Dupuytren as being the first to recognise the phenomenon. Langer punctured numerous holes at short distances from each other into the skin of a cadaver with a tool that had a circular-shaped tip, similar to an ice pick. He noticed that the resultant punctures in the skin had ellipsoidal shapes. From this testing he observed patterns and was able to determine "line directions" by the longer axes of the ellipsoidal holes and lines.

== Application ==
Knowing the direction of Langer's lines within a specific area of the skin is important for surgical operations, particularly cosmetic surgery. If a surgeon has a choice about where and in what direction to place an incision, they may choose to cut in the direction of Langer's lines. Incisions made parallel to Langer's lines may heal better and produce less scarring than those that cut across. Conversely, incisions perpendicular to Langer's lines have a tendency to pucker and remain obvious, although sometimes this is unavoidable. The orientation of stab wounds relative to Langer's lines can have a considerable impact upon the presentation of the wound.

Langer's lines include breast static tension lines, which mark a guide for breast surgery incisions.

Keloids are more common when incision is given across Langer's lines. Sometimes the exact direction of the collagen fibers are unknown, because in some regions of the body there are differences between different individuals.

== Alternatives ==
Other authors have created topological skin maps. Kraissl's lines differ from Langer's lines particularly on the face. Also, while Langer's lines were defined in cadavers, Kraissl's lines have been defined in living individuals. The method used to identify Kraissl's lines is not traumatic.

== See also ==
- Blaschko's lines
- Kraissl's lines
- Relaxed Skin Tension Lines
- Dermatology
- Forensic pathology
- Morphology (biology)
- Phenotype
- Phenotypic plasticity
