= Cataracts (canine) =

Canine cataracts

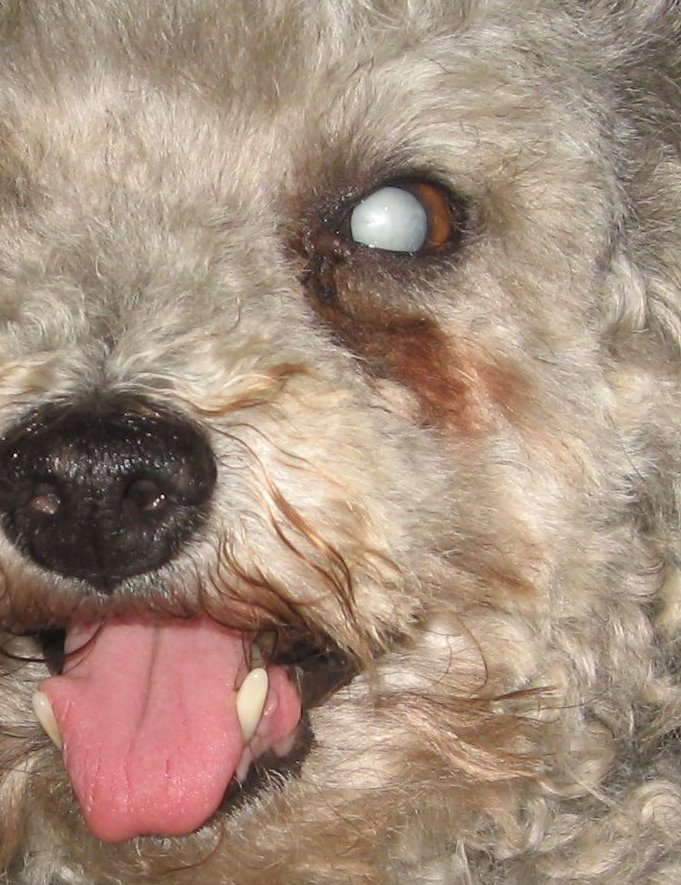
A dog with cataracts.

Canine cataracts are a prevalent cause of visual loss in dogs, frequently resulting in blindness. Cataracts typically occur when proteins break down in the lens of a dog's eye and clump together, obstructing the passage of light. There are several reasons cataracts may occur in dogs, such as heredity, trauma, aging, diabetes, glaucoma, and progressive retinal atrophy.

== Causes ==
Cataracts can be genetic, existing in breeds who are predisposed to developing them. Canine diabetes is another common cause of canine cataracts, due to the increased concentration of glucose in the lens, which swells the lens. A third prevalent cause of canine cataracts is developmental, in which certain embryological conditions, like toxins or infections, cause cataracts present at birth. Two different mutations in the HSF4 gene cause hereditary cataracts amongst some breeds.

== Classification ==
Veterinarians use a common classification system to assess a patient's suitability for cataract surgery and to inform of potential treatment options. A cataract may not progress through all the stages.

An incipient cataract involves a small area of the lens and vision is impacted to a small degree. An immature cataract involves around 10-99% impact on the lens, with variable vision impacts. A mature cataract involves a lens that is totally impacted, with full vision loss. Finally, a hypermature or Morganian cataract involves the liquification of the lens protein, causing a crystallized appearance in the eye. A cataract at this stage may risk retinal detachment, where the retina begins to detach from the back of the eye.

Additionally, cataracts are categorized by their age of onset, depending on whether the canine developed cataracts congenitally, as a juvenile, or as a senior.

== Treatment ==
Currently, the only method to successfully remove a cataract and restore vision is through surgery.

Some cataracts, like incipient cataracts, affect vision to a small degree and do not always warrant surgery. However, continuous monitoring of any progression is necessary to assess the possibility of further treatment. When a cataract is deemed likely to progress, treatment is then recommended.

Canine cataract surgery involves small incisions in the cornea. The process is more intensive than in human cataract surgery, mainly due to the larger lens area in dogs than in humans which requires more power to break up the cataract, the need for general anesthesia, and post-operative care that involves anti-inflammatory medication and eye drops. Finally, unlike humans, the corneal incisions do not self seal, so they must be sutured after the surgery. Success rates for canine cataract surgery are around 80-95%, but this is variable on the breed of dog and the cataract classification.
