= Christian August Voigt =

Austrian anatomist

Christian August Voigt (21 August 1808 – 10 February 1890) was an Austrian anatomist.

== Biography ==
Voigt was born on 21 August 1808 in born in Brody, Galicia. He studied medicine in Vienna, receiving his doctorate in 1841 with a dissertation titled, De systemate Intermedio vasorum eiusque radicibus. In Vienna, he was influenced by the work of anatomist Christian Joseph Berres (1796–1844). From 1847 to 1850, he was a professor at the surgical-medical college in Laibach, afterwards teaching classes in Lemberg (1850–1854), Kraków (1854–1861) and Vienna (1861–1878), where he was a professor of anatomy and histology. Voigt was a member of the Vienna Academy of Sciences.

Voigt is remembered for his anatomical investigations of the hair and skin. His name is associated with "Voigt's line", a pigmentary demarcation line that sometimes affects dark-skinned individuals. It is described as a dorsoventral line of pigmentation occurring symmetrically and bilaterally for about ten centimeters along the lateral edge of the biceps. The phenomenon is also known as "Futcher's line".

== Written works ==
- Abhandlung über die Richtung der Haare am menschlichen Körper, 1857 – Treatise on the direction of hair on the human body.
- Über ein System neu entdeckter Linien an der Oberfläche des Körpers und über Hauptvera¨stelungs-Gebiete der Hautnerven, 1857 – A system of newly found lines on the surface of the human body, etc.
- Beiträge zur Dermato-Neurologie, nebst der Beschreibung eines Systems neu entdeckter Linien an der Oberfläche des menschlichen Körpers, 1864 – Contributions to dermato-neurology, including the description of a system of newly discovered lines on the surface of the human body.

Books about Christian August Voigt

- "Christian August Voigt (1808–1890), Professor der Anatomie in Laibach, Lemberg, Krakau und Wien", by Maria Habacher; 1967.
