= Lichen striatus =

- Other names: Blaschko linear acquired inflammatory skin eruption and Linear lichenoid dermatosis
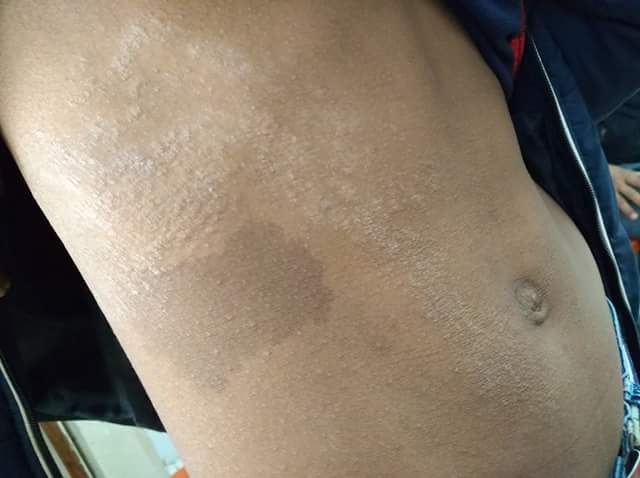
- Specialty: Dermatology

Lichen striatus is a rare skin condition that is seen primarily in children, most frequently appearing ages 5–15. It consists of a self-limiting eruption of small, scaly papules.

== Symptoms ==
Lichen striatus impacts the skin and nails. It is seen as an unbroken or disrupted, linear band consisting of small tan, pink or flesh colored papules.

The papules can be smooth, flat topped or scaly. The band of lichen striatus varies from a few millimeters to 1–2 cm (0.39–0.79 in) wide and extends from a few centimeters to the complete length of the extremity. By and large, the papules are unilateral and appear on extremities along the lines of Blaschko.

Itching is a common symptom of the disorder.

== Diagnosis ==
Diagnosis is based on visual examination of the lesions.

== Management ==
It is self-limiting condition. Treatment can include steroid creams and moisturizers.

== See also ==
- Lichen planus
- List of cutaneous conditions
