= Blaschko's lines =

Anatomical structure

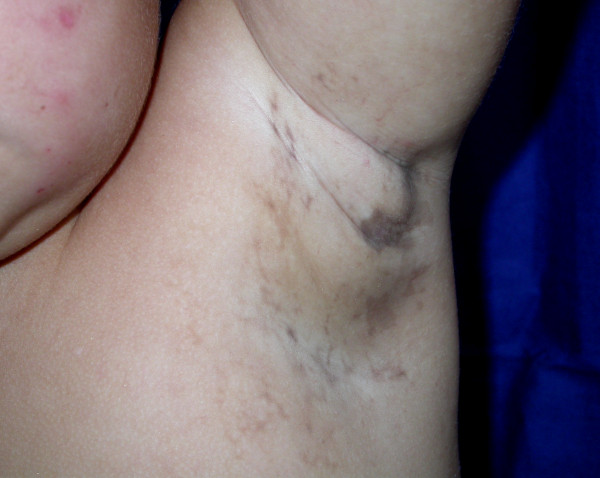
- Incontinentia pigmenti forming along Blaschko's lines in a 3-year-old girl

Blaschko's lines, also called the lines of Blaschko, are lines of normal cell development in the skin. These lines are only visible in those with a mosaic skin condition or in chimeras where different cell lines contain different genes. These lines may express different amounts of melanin, or become visible due to a differing susceptibility to disease. In such individuals, they can become apparent as whorls, patches, streaks, or lines in a linear or segmental distribution over the skin. They follow a V shape over the back, S-shaped whirls over the chest and sides, and wavy shapes on the head. Not all mosaic skin conditions follow Blaschko's lines.

The lines are believed to trace the migration of embryonic cells. They do not correspond to underlying nervous, muscular, or lymphatic systems. The lines are not unique to humans and can be observed in non-human animals with mosaicism.

Alfred Blaschko is credited with the first demonstration of these lines in 1901.

== Signs and symptoms ==
Depiction of Blaschko's lines, patterns present in the skin of a human female, male

The skin lesions that follow Blaschko's lines are varied. They include genetic, congenital, and acquired (i.e., non-genetic) conditions. Examples include:

- Chimerism
- Pigmentary disorders
  - Nevus achromicus (including incontinentia pigmenti achromians, also known as hypomelanosis of Ito)
  - Epidermal nevus
    - Nevus sebaceus
    - Inflammatory linear verrucous epidermal nevus
- X-linked genetic skin disorders
  - Incontinentia pigmenti
  - CHILD syndrome
  - X-linked reticulate pigmentary disorder
- Acquired inflammatory skin rashes
  - Lichen striatus
  - Lichen planus
  - Lupus erythematosus
- Linear atrophoderma of Moulin
- McCune–Albright syndrome
- Smith-Kingsmore syndrome

== History ==
Alfred Blaschko, a private practice dermatologist from Berlin, first described and drew the patterns of the lines of Blaschko in 1901. He obtained his data by studying over 140 patients with various nevoid and acquired skin diseases and transposed the visible patterns the diseases followed onto dolls and statues, then compiled the patterns onto a composite schematic of the human body. He described a system of lines across the surface of the human body that nevi and dermatological diseases tended to follow, unrelated to the dermatomes of the body or any other cutaneous or subcutaneous structure. In the same month of 1901, an American dermatologist named Douglas Montgomery presented his own research paper before the American Dermatological Society, based on his studies of extensive linear nevi in human patients. Similar to Blaschko, he suggested that the linear patterns of nevi followed "streams" of tissue growth that occurred during embryogenesis rather than being related to an epidermal structure.

In 1945, the Journal of Heredity published Russian scientist Moisey Davidovich Zlotnikov's research describing a 24-year-old woman with a unilateral, systematized nevus across the left side of her body, and proposed that the disorder was due to a mutation during the cell cleavage stage of development. Based on this hypothesis, Zlotnikov suggested that the only probable explanation for the sagittal asymmetry of the disease was a genetic mosaicism in the patient. However, this proposal was not widely explored until re-hypothesized by German dermatologist Rudolf Happle in the 1970s due to the state of genetic and medical research in the Soviet Union at the time, and the recent end of World War II.

The lines of Blaschko were first referred to as such by the English-speaking medical community after 1976, when Robert Jackson published a review and reconsideration of Blaschko's research. Jackson wished to inspire interaction between dermatologists who saw Blaschko's lines in patients, and developmental biologists studying embryology and chromosomal abnormalities such as mosaicism.

Scientists such as Rudolf Happle and Jean Bolognia have further differentiated Blaschko's lines from other linear phenomena, such as Langer's lines, and expanded the map of the lines over the human body to include areas of the head, face, and neck, where Blaschko's original maps did not cover. In 1985, Rudolf Happle proposed a link to lyonization and investigated the link to other X-linked skin disorders. Since that year, scientists have continually explored the developmental hypothesis for the origins of Blaschko's lines, having found biological evidence to support the theory and linking the lines to other mosaicism and genetic-development related conditions and phenomena of the skin.

== See also ==
- Head zones (dermatomes)
- Kraissl's lines
- Langer's lines
- List of cutaneous conditions
