= Wedding ring (disambiguation) =

A wedding ring is a metal ring indicating the wearer is married.

Wedding ring may also refer to:

- Wedding ring cushion, a small pillow on which the wedding rings are carried
- The Wedding Ring, a novel by Hannah Maria Jones
- "Wedding Ring" (song), a 1965 song by Australian band The Easybeats
- Wedding Ring (TV series), a Russian television series

== Film ==
- Wedding Rings (film), 1929 American film directed by William Beaudine
- The Wedding Ring (1944 film), Czech film directed by Martin Frič
- Wedding Ring (film), 1950 Japanese film directed by Keisuke Kinoshita
- The Wedding Ring (1970 film), French film directed by Christian de Chalonge
- The Wedding Ring (2016 film), Nigerien film
