= Pembroke cattle =

Cattle breed

Pembroke cattle were a breed of dual-purpose short-legged, hardy, black cattle native to Wales. A society was formed in 1867 to try to improve the breed, and the first register of Pembroke cattle was published in 1874. Pembroke cattle were registered with black cattle from North Wales in 1904, to create the Welsh Black breed.

== Characteristics ==
Pembroke cattle were described as being coal black. William Youatt said some had white faces and white about the udder, but this was ascribed to cross-breeding by Read. The horns which at first incline outwards and forwards, and then bend somewhat upwards and inwards, are light coloured with black tips. They were reported to be good milk producers, with many being sold to London town dairies. Historically, they were well regarded for their suitability for droving to England for sale to Graziers. Store cattle of the breed were favoured for grazing in Sussex and Kent, especially on the Pevensey Levels, and many also went to the English Midlands.

== History ==
The ancient breed was indigenous to the old Welsh counties of Pembrokeshire, Carmarthenshire, and South Cardiganshire. There were distinct strains in the Castlemartin area of South Pembrokeshire and the Dewsland area of north Pembrokeshire. These cattle were locally regarded as hardier on the poor land than English dairy breeds such as the Shorthorn. Both types were later amalgamated into the Welsh Black breed for which a herdbook was opened in 1874. By the end of the 19th century, some 25,000 black cattle from South Wales were being sold to England annually.
