= Glamorgan cattle =

Breed of cattle

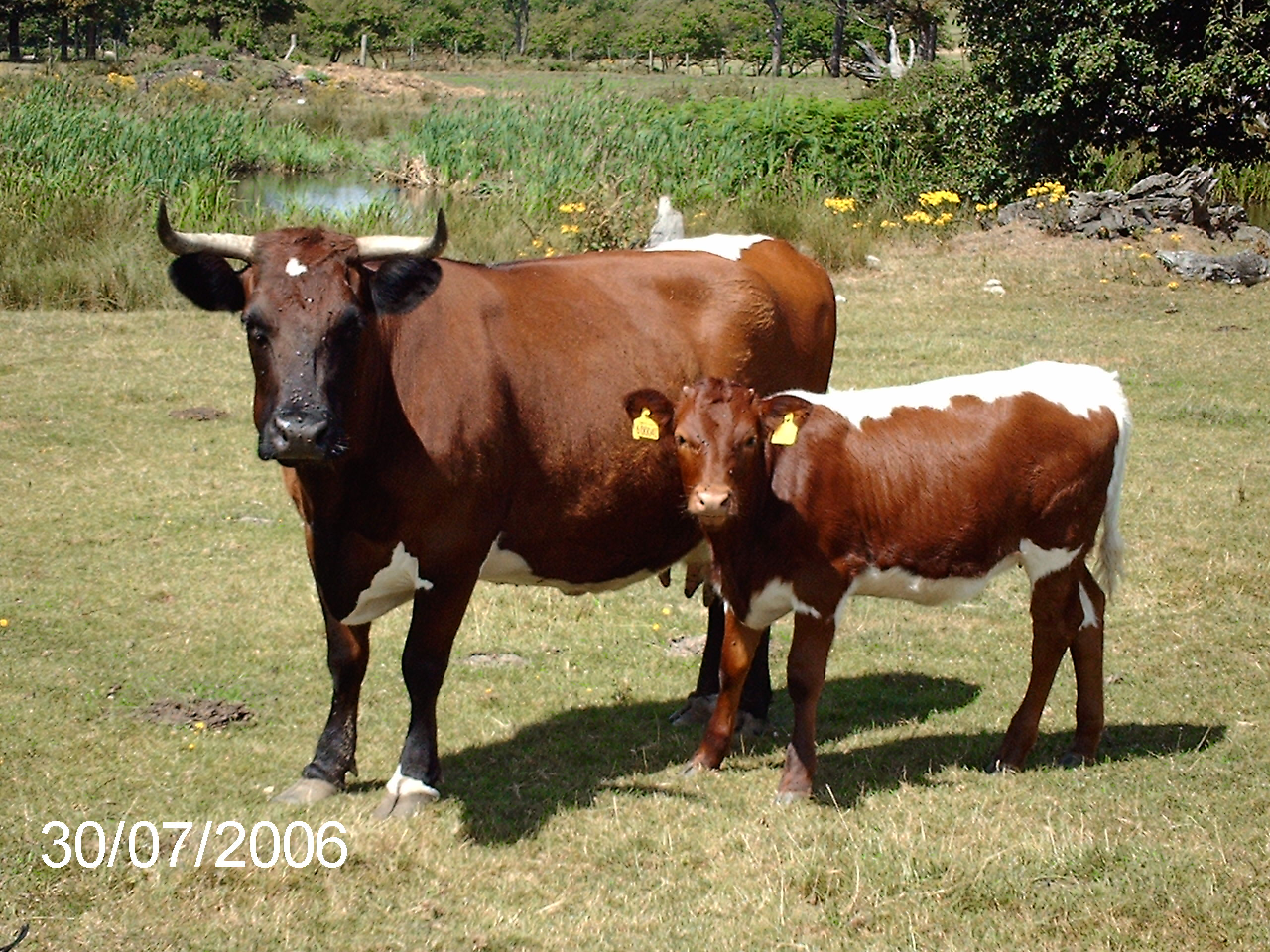
Cow and calf

Glamorgan Cattle (Welsh: Gwartheg Morgannwg) are a rare British cattle breed. Once common in the counties of Glamorgan, Monmouth, and Brecon, the breed was thought to have died out, until a remnant herd was found in the 1970s.

Glamorgan cattle can be recognised by their chestnut coloured coat and broad white stripe along the backbone, down the tail, and under the belly.

== Decline ==
The cows were reputed to be very good milkers, producing high butterfat milk, and were held in high regard by King George III, who had a herd of them on his farm in Windsor. He also used Glamorgan oxen for farm work. The breed was not esteemed for its ability to produce high yields of beef however, and during the 19th century it became increasingly common to cross Glamorgan cattle with other breeds such as Hereford, Ayrshire, and Shorthorn cattle to improve the beef yield, and in time, the breed would almost disappear due to crossbreeding and farmers moving to other breeds.

In 1875 John Coleman in his The Cattle of Great Britain wrote: "they have gradually declined in character and in numbers, until at the present time there is no pure herd of these cattle to be found in the county where they were so long held supreme.", and R. J. Colyer wrote: "By the close of the [19th] century the effect of cross-breeding had been such that no pure Glamorgan herds remained." By the 1920s it was generally thought that the breed was effectively extinct.

== Revival ==
In 1979 Major 'Teddy' Savage of Sedlescombe, near Hastings in East Sussex, decided to sell his cattle herd which he claimed included Glamorgan cattle, Pembroke cattle and Gloucester cattle. He first offered his cattle to the Rare Breeds Survival Trust, but the Trust decided not to buy them as there was no documentation to confirm the origins of the Glamorgan cattle and the Pembroke cattle. The (purported) Pembroke cattle were sold in a local market but have subsequently disappeared. However, West Glamorgan County Council learnt of the sale and purchased the Glamorgans and brought them to Margam Country Park in Neath Port Talbot to ensure the survival of the breed. This herd remains and on display at the park.

Glamorgan cattle are similar in colour to the Austrian Pinzgau cattle, although it is not clear whether there is any relationship. Nevertheless, Margam Country Park bought a Pinzgau bull in 1994 in order to improve the bloodline.

== Bibliography ==
- Paul Weaver, 'A Glamorgan Cattle History', The Ark, 2000 (Autumn) 92–3.
