= Stinking Bishop =

English semi-soft cheese

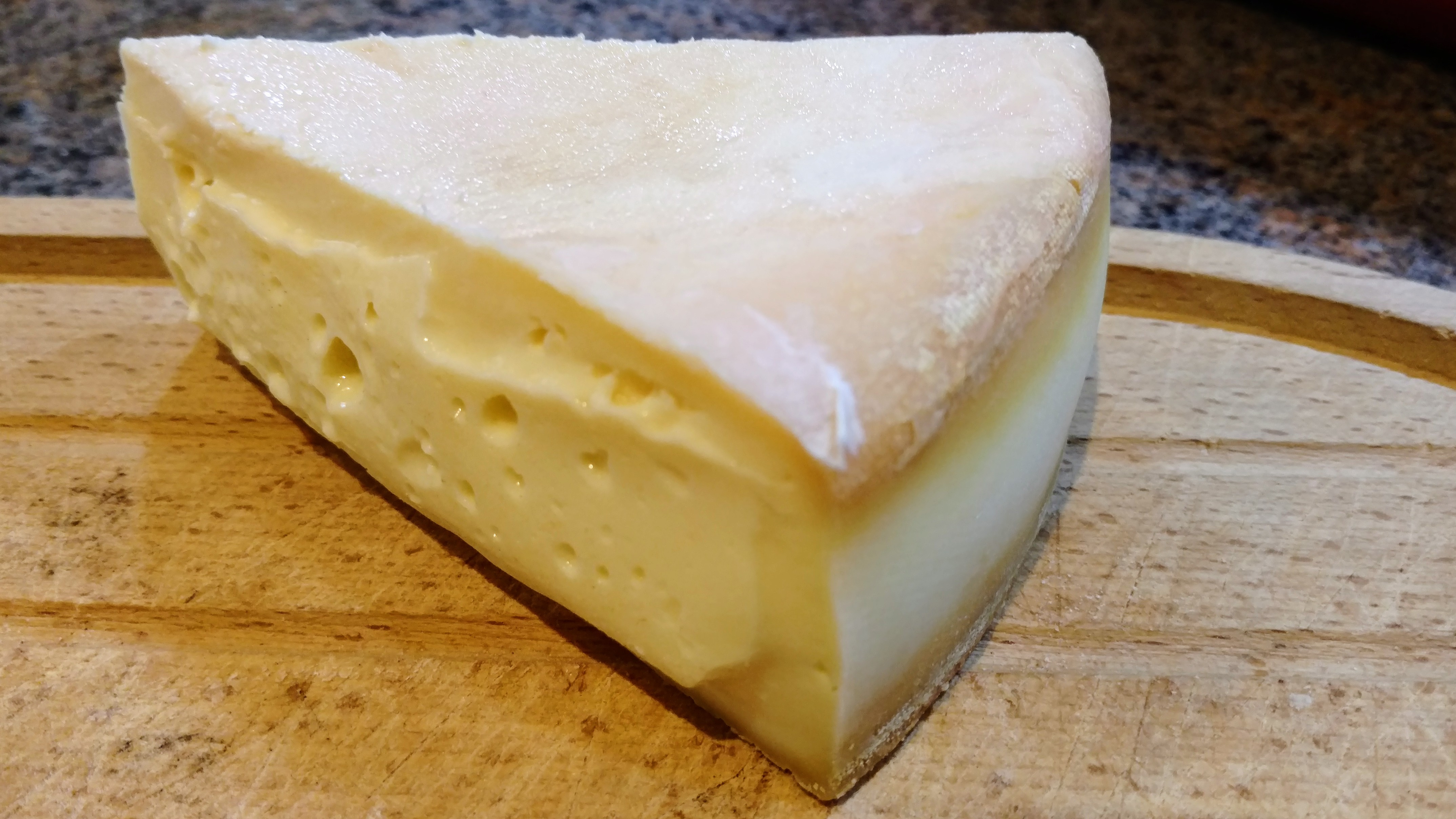
- Country of origin: United Kingdom
- Region: Gloucestershire
- Town: Dymock
- Source of milk: Cow
- Pasteurised: Yes
- Texture: Smooth, creamy, semi-soft
- Fat content: 48%
- Aging time: c. 4 months

Stinking Bishop is a washed-rind cheese produced since 1972 by Charles Martell and Son at Hunts Court Farm, Dymock, Gloucestershire, in the west of England. It is made from the milk of Old Gloucester cattle.

== History ==
By 1972, just 68 heifers of the Old Gloucester breed were left in the world. Charles Martell bought up many of the surviving cows, and began to produce cheese from their milk, not initially for its own sake, but to promote interest in the breed. With a revival of interest from other farmers in the endangered breed, overall Gloucester cow numbers began to recover, increasing to around 450 by 2016. Martell's own herd of cows had expanded over the years; it still remained relatively small for a dairy herd, at 25 head by 2015, meaning that the Gloucester milk needed to be combined and pasteurised with the milk of Friesian cattle from other nearby farms, for cheese production to be economically viable.

Stinking Bishop is an artisanal, handmade cheese, so it is not marketed through supermarkets. As of 2017 it had over 130 stockists across the UK, retailing in artisan food stores and delicatessens, as well as in Harrods and Selfridges.

== Characteristics ==
The colour of Stinking Bishop ranges from white-yellow to beige, with an orange to grey rind. It is moulded into wheels two kilograms (4.4 lb) in weight, 20 centimetres (7.9 in) in diameter, and 4 centimetres (1.6 in) deep. Only about 1,000 wheels, or twenty tonnes (44,000 lb) are produced each year.

The distinctive odour comes from the ripening process, during which the cheese is rind-washed: it is immersed in perry (the traditional pear cider of the region) made from the local Stinking Bishop pear – from which the cheese gets its name – every four weeks while it matures. To increase the moisture content and to encourage bacterial activity, salt is not added until the cheese is removed from its mould. The fat content is 48 per cent.

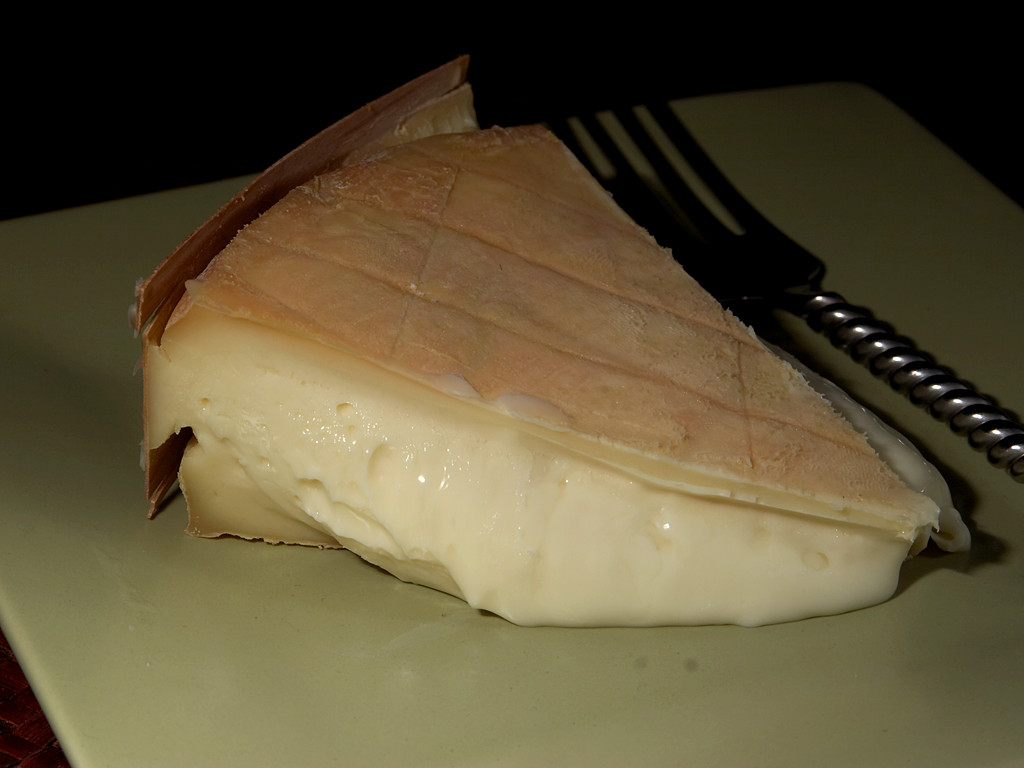
A slice showing typical maturation at room temperature

== Popular culture ==
The cheese was brought to international attention by the animated comedy Wallace & Gromit. In the 2005 animated film The Curse of the Were-Rabbit, Gromit uses it to revive Wallace. Demand for the cheese subsequently rose by 500 percent, forcing the cheesemaker to hire more staff and increase production. It was also referenced again at the end of Episode 4 of Wallace and Gromit's World of Invention, where Wallace samples an even more pungent – fictional – variant of Stinking Bishop, called "Stinking Archbishop".

Chef Andrew Zimmern, host of the TV show Bizarre Foods (Travel Channel), in an episode about the U.K., samples Stinking Bishop cheese during a visit to the Borough Market in London.

In the 2011 Channel 4 show King Of..., host Claudia Winkleman and her two guests Chris Evans and Sarah Millican adjudicate on contenders for the King of Cheese; Stinking Bishop was awarded the title by Winkleman and Evans (with Millican expressing dislike for cheese in general).

== Awards ==
- 2010, Gold Medal Winner at the British Cheese Awards

== See also ==
- List of British cheeses
