= Stinking Bishop (pear) =

Pear cultivar

Pear 'Stinking Bishop'
- Genus: Pyrus
- Species: Pyrus communis
- Cultivar: "Stinking Bishop"
- Breeder: Frederick Bishop, 1800s
- Origin: Dymock

'Stinking Bishop' is a variety (cultivar) of pear cultivated near Dymock in Gloucestershire, England, primarily for perry.

The main name of the cultivar is actually 'Moorcroft', named after the farm at Colwall where it first arose, and 'Stinking Bishop' is only one of several other names, including 'Malvern Hills', 'Malvern Pear', 'Choke Pear', and 'Choker'.

The name 'Stinking Bishop' refers to Frederick (or Percy) Bishop, who owned Moorcroft Farm in the early 1800s and was presumably the cultivar's breeder. Bishop allegedly had an ugly temperament. In a 2005 American National Public Radio interview, Charles Martell, the maker of Stinking Bishop cheese, related a story that Bishop got angry at his kettle one day for not heating fast enough and in retaliation shot it. This story, although apocryphal, illustrates the sort of behaviour that earned Bishop his reputation for irascibility.

== Characteristics ==
'Moorcroft' is a medium-sized pear of rounded-conical shape; it has a greenish-yellow skin, turning bright yellow, and some russetting. Its juice has medium acidity and tannin with little or no citric acid present; in the 19th century, it was praised for making perry with good alcoholic strength and flavour.
