= Ellen Pickering =

British novelist

- Born: 1802
- Died: 25 November 1843 (aged 40–41); Bath, Somerset
- Occupation: Novelist
- Writing career
- Years active: 1826–1843
- Period: Victorian era

Ellen Pickering (1802 – 25 November 1843) was a British novelist who published sixteen three-volume novels, one of them posthumously. At a time when stories about gypsies were common in nineteenth-century Victorian literature, Pickering achieved her greatest success with the novel Nan Darrell, or The Gypsy Mother (1839). Her books mixed history and romance in the style of Sir Walter Scott.

== Life and work ==
Ellen Pickering was baptized on 21 August 1802 at Lyndhurst, Hampshire near the family estate of Foxlease, to Isaac Pickering (of Kingston Lisle, (was Berkshire now Oxfordshire)) and Katherine nee Collins (from East Lockinge, (was Berkshire now Oxfordshire). The Pickering family income was derived from the Trinidad and Virgin Islands Caribbean slave trade; when the practice was made illegal, the family moved to Bathwick a suburb of Bath, Somerset in South West England. Pickering had early success as a writer and she reputedly earned £100 a year (equivalent to £8,080 in 2025) after she started publishing in 1825. Her books mixed history and romance in the style of Sir Walter Scott. Pickering wrote sixteen three-volume novels up to 1840.

Her novel Nan Darrell, or The Gypsy Mother (1839) was her most successful book and was reprinted five times up to 1865, years after her death. The novel was first written just after the success of a gypsy trilogy published by British novelist Hannah Maria Jones (1784–1854). (Note: See Jones, Hannah Maria (1833) The Gipsy Mother, or, The Miseries of Enforced Marriage. London: Virtue, Tallis. OCLC 562668528.) The motif of gypsies, particularly in the fictional role of kidnappers, was popular in nineteenth-century Victorian literature. Nan Darrell, or The Gypsy Mother features a lead gypsy character reminiscent of Meg Merrilies from Scott's novel Guy Mannering.

Pickering died in Bath, Somerset, in 1843 of scarlet fever and was buried 29 November that year at St Mary's Church, Bathwick. Her partially complete novel The Grandfather was finished and published by her friend the novelist Elizabeth Youatt.

== Legacy ==
Cultural historian Mary Poovey notes that Pickering "enjoyed success among her contemporaries but achieved no lasting legacy". Contemporary feminist scholars have debated the value of her work.

== Selected works ==
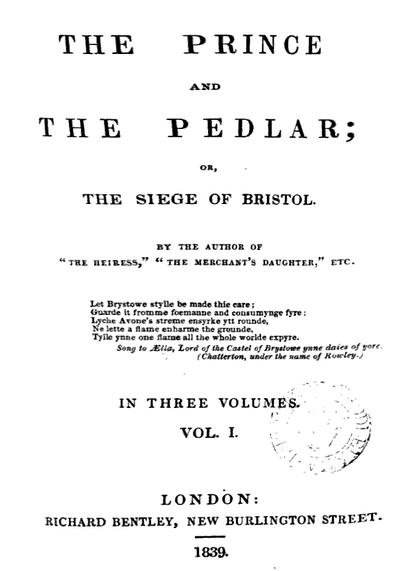
The Prince and the Pedlar (1839)

Pickering published a total of sixteen novels. The Grandfather was published posthumously.

- The Marriage of the Favourite, or, She Bred Him a Soldier, 1826
- The Heiress (three volumes), 1833
- Agnes Serle, 1835
- The Merchant's Daughter, 1836
- The Prince and the Pedlar, or The Siege of Bristol, 1839
- The Squire, 1837
- Nan Darrell, or The Gipsy Mother, 1839
- The Fright, 1839
- The Quiet Husband, 1840
- Who Shall Be Heir?, 1840
- The Secret Foe, 1841
- The Expectant, 1842
- Cousin Hinton, or, Friend or Foe?, 1843
- Charades for Acting, 1843
- The Grumbler, 1843
- The Grandfather, 1846 (completed by a friend) (An edition exists published in fragile tan wrappers with an imprint of New York: Harper & Brothers, 1844. No. 39 - Library of Select Novels
