= Mary Poovey =

American historian

- Born: Mary Louise Poovey

Academic background
- Education: University of Virginia
- Thesis: The novel as imaginative order (1976)

Academic work
- Institutions: New York University
- Main interests: Cultural historian and literary critic
- Notable works: The Proper Lady and the Woman Writer: Ideology as Style in the Works of Mary Wollstonecraft, Mary Shelley, and Jane Austen
- Notable ideas: Victorian era

Mary Louise Poovey is an American cultural historian and literary critic whose work focuses on the Victorian Era. She is Samuel Rudin University Professor Emeritus in the Humanities at New York University, with her recent retirement from the position, and Director of the Institute for the History of the Production of Knowledge. Poovey has taught at Johns Hopkins University, Swarthmore College, and Yale University.

== Education ==
Poovey gained her PhD from the University of Virginia in 1976.

== Proper women ==
In 1984 Poovey published The Proper Lady and the Woman Writer: Ideology as Style in the Works of Mary Wollstonecraft, Mary Shelley, and Jane Austen. Her book is based around the idea of a "Proper Lady" and she looks at the difficulties that these three important authors had in breaking free from this mould.

== Feminist readings ==
Poovey has been recognised as important in the work that she has done in feminist reading. She has looked at how the growth of women writing was a device for seeing their voices emerge.

Poovey conducted a public re-evaluation in 1999 at the British Women Writers Conference as a theoretical exercise of a writer's work. Poovey re-read the works of Ellen Pickering and decided that they were not worth reviving. This novelist's works had been popular in the 19th century but she considered the books to be over-complicated and lacking in innovation. She concluded that the only reason to re-read works like this was to confirm that the books that we had chosen to remember, like Jane Eyre and Mary Barton, are the best of their type. Poovey used her re-reading of Pickering's novels to argue that not all writers need to be revived into the literary canon. Tamara Wagner went on to argue that this shows that we need to debunk our "history of reading these texts back from reality"?

== Honors ==
On January 30, 2015 Poovey received an honorary doctorate from the Faculty of Social Sciences at Uppsala University, Sweden.

== Works ==
PhD Thesis

- Poovey, Mary (1976). The novel as imaginative order (Ph.D. thesis). University of Virginia. OCLC 2812233.

Her books include:

- Poovey, Mary (1985). The Proper Lady and the Woman Writer: Ideology as Style in the Works of Mary Wollstonecraft, Mary Shelley, and Jane Austen. Chicago: University of Chicago Press. ISBN 9780226675282. Preview.
- Poovey, Mary (1988). Uneven Developments: the Ideological Work of Gender in mid-Victorian England. Chicago: University of Chicago Press. ISBN 9780226675305.
- Nightingale, Florence (1992). Poovey, Mary (ed.). Cassandra and Other Selections from Suggestions for Thought. New York: New York University Press. ISBN 9780814757758.
- Poovey, Mary (1995). Making a Social Body: British Cultural Formation, 1830-1864. Chicago: University of Chicago Press. ISBN 9780226675244. Preview.
- Poovey, Mary (1996), "Scenes of an indelicate character: the medical treatment of Victorian women", in Jackson, Stevi; Scott, Sue (eds.), Feminism and Sexuality: a Reader, New York: Columbia University Press, pp. 40–45, ISBN 9780231107082.
- Poovey, Mary (1998). A History of the Modern Fact: Problems of Knowledge in the Sciences of Wealth and Society. Chicago: University of Chicago Press. ISBN 9780226675268. Preview.
- Poovey, Mary (2003). The Financial System in Nineteenth-Century Britain. New York: Oxford University Press. ISBN 9780195150575.
- Poovey, Mary (2008). Genres of the Credit Economy: Mediating Value in Eighteenth- and Nineteenth-Century Britain. Chicago: University of Chicago Press. ISBN 9780226675329. Preview.
- Brine, Kevin R.; Poovey, Mary (2017). Finance in America: An Unfinished Story. Chicago: University of Chicago Press. ISBN 9780226502182.
