= Elizabeth Youatt =

British novelist

- Born: Elizabeth Jones Youatt; 29 March 1816; London, England
- Died: 18 January 1879 (aged 62); Bloomsbury, London, England
- Parent: William Youatt

Elizabeth Jones Youatt (29 March 1816 – 18 January 1879), also known as Mrs. W. H. Coates, was an English novelist.

Youatt was one of four daughters born to the veterinary surgeon William Youatt and his wife, Mary Payne. She wrote a large number of short novels for the Religious Tract Society. Her two most notable works were three volume novels published in the 1840s. She was baptised in the Church of England as an adult, in 1843.

Her father was the Queen's vet; he died by suicide in January 1847, at the age of 71. Her mother died a few months later in June.

In 1851, she married William Henry Coates Jr., who was secretary to the Royal College of Veterinary Surgeons. When her friend, the more successful novelist Ellen Pickering, died prematurely in 1851, she completed Pickering's novel, The Grandfather.

She died at 10, Red Lion Square in Bloomsbury, "after many years of patient suffering".
