= William Fream =

English agriculturist and writer (1854–1906)

- Born: 1854; Gloucester
- Died: 1906 (aged 51–52); Downton
- Resting place: Gloucester cemetery
- Education: Sir Thomas Rich's Blue Coat Hospital
- Alma mater: Royal College of Science, Dublin
- Occupation: Writer
- Relatives: John Fream and Mary Grant
- Writing career
- Subject: Agriculture
- Notable work: The Elements of Agriculture

William Fream (1854–1906) was an English writer on agriculture.

== Life ==
Born at Gloucester, he was second son in the family of four sons and three daughters of John Fream, a builder and contractor, by his wife Mary Grant. As a boy he was a chorister in Gloucester Cathedral. After education at Sir Thomas Rich's Blue Coat Hospital, he worked for a Gloucester corn and seed merchant.

Gaining a royal exhibition at the Royal College of Science, Dublin, in May 1872, Fream studied there for three years, and took prizes in botany, practical chemistry, and geology, with special distinction in geology. While in Ireland he made botanical walking tours Connemara and other wild parts of the country. He became an associate of the Royal College by diploma. He also matriculated at the University of London, and graduated in science with honours in chemistry at the first B.Sc. examination in 1877.

From 1877 to 1879 Fream was professor of natural history at the Royal Agricultural College, Cirencester. In 1879 he filled a temporary vacancy as lecturer and demonstrator in botany at Guy's Hospital Medical School. The following winter he studied botany and zoology at the Royal School of Mines in London, also taking up writing for the agricultural press. Early in 1880 he joined John Wrightson in establishing and developing the College of Agriculture at Downton, Wiltshire. He taught natural history there and instituted field classes and laboratory demonstrations.

Fream paid visits to Canada in 1884, 1888 and 1891; in 1888 he received from McGill University an honorary degree of LL.D. In 1890 Eleanor Anne Ormerod chose Fream to be the first Steven lecturer at Edinburgh University on agricultural entomology; he had included the first course on the subject in Great Britain in his curriculum at Downton, and remained Steven lecturer for the rest of his life. An unsuccessful candidate in March 1887 for the post of secretary of the Royal Agricultural Society of England, he was appointed in 1890 editor of the Journal of the society, when it became a quarterly; he resigned in 1900, when it became an annual publication. He was a chief examiner in the principles of agriculture under the Science and Art Department, South Kensington.

In 1890 Fream was employed by the Board of Agriculture to report on agricultural education in Scotland. He lived mostly at Downton, but he had working quarters in London. He died, unmarried, at Downton on 29 May 1906, and was buried in Gloucester cemetery.

== Works ==
Fream's major book was The Elements of Agriculture, published for the Royal Agricultural Society of England, in 1891 (7th edit. 1902). The Rothamsted Experiments on the Growth of Wheat, Barley, and the Mixed Herbage of Grass-land (1888) was a textbook. He published also:

- The Gates of the West (1892)
- Across Canada: a Report on Canada and its Agricultural Resources, written for and published by the government of Canada (Ottawa, 1885)
- Canadian Agriculture (parts i. and ii.), in Journal of the Royal Agricultural Society (1885)
- The Farms and Forests of Canada, as illustrated in the Colonial and Indian Exhibition of 1886 (Toronto, 1886)
- The Provincial Agriculture of Canada (London, 1887).

For 12 years, from January 1894 till his death, Fream was agricultural correspondent of The Times, writing weekly articles on agriculture and annual reports on crop returns. He edited the 13th and 14th editions of William Youatt's Complete Grazier (1893 and 1900).

== Notes ==
Attribution

This article incorporates text from a publication now in the public domain: Lee, Sidney, ed. (1912). "Fream, William". Dictionary of National Biography (2nd supplement). Vol. 2. London: Smith, Elder & Co.
