= Hannah Maria Jones =

British novelist

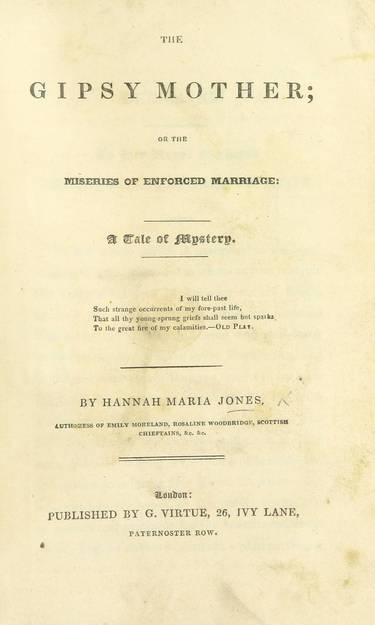
- 1835 book cover
- Born: 1784?
- Died: 1854

Hannah Maria Jones (1784? – 1854) was a British novelist. Jones' most successful work was a trilogy about gypsies; including The Gypsy Mother (1835) and The Gypsy Girl (1836, also known as The Heir of Hazel Dell). It is thought that Jones may not have received the money she deserved from these books and other more successful authors like Ellen Pickering published similar works.

Jones' early life is unclear. She is thought to have been born in 1784 although later dates have been suggested. She married a Mr Jones and in the 1820s she published Gretna Green (1820), The British Officer (1821); The Wedding Ring (1824), The Forged Note (1824) and The Victim of Fashion (1825). Jones made little money from this work although she was able to look after her husband who was ill. However the facts are from application to the Royal Literary Fund and may therefore be exaggerated.

Jones lived with another writer named John Lownes, and although they never married, she used his surname. Their frequent and sometimes dubious applications to the Royal Literary Funds became well known.
