= Old Gloucester =

British breed of cattle

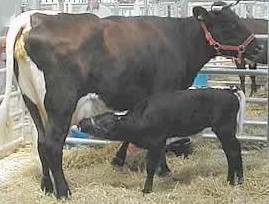
- Cow and calf
- Conservation status: FAO (2007): endangered-maintained; DAD-IS (2022): endangered; RBST (2022): priority
- Other names: Gloucestershire; Gloucester
- Country of origin: United Kingdom
- Standard: Gloucester Cattle Society
- Use: formerly triple-purpose, draught/milk/meat; now dual-purpose, milk/meat

Traits
- Weight: Male: average 857 kg; Female: average 583 kg
- Height: Male: average 143 cm; Female: average 129 cm
- Horn status: horned; de-horning permitted
- Cattle; Bos (primigenius) taurus

The Old Gloucester or Gloucester is a traditional British breed of cattle originating in Gloucestershire and surrounding areas in the West Country of England. It was originally a triple-purpose breed, reared for milk, for beef and for draught use; it is now a dual-purpose animal. It is an endangered breed, and its conservation status is listed as "priority" by the Rare Breeds Survival Trust.

== History ==
The Gloucester is a traditional breed of the West Country of England, particularly of Gloucestershire, the Cotswolds and the Severn Valley. Its origins are unknown; it appears to have been closely related to the original Welsh Glamorgan, which became extinct before 1900. It was originally a triple-purpose breed, reared for its milk, for beef and for draught use.

It remained in widespread use until the eighteenth century, when numbers began to decline as a result of competition with both the Longhorn and the Shorthorn; numbers remained low throughout the nineteenth century.

The breed received official recognition from the Board of Agriculture in 1911. A breed society, the Gloucester Cattle Society, was started in 1919; there were at that time about 130 of the cattle. The decline continued for much of the twentieth century, accelerated by the foot-and-mouth outbreak of 1923–1924, the Great Depression in the 1930s, and the Second World War.

Some efforts were made to increase the competitiveness of the Gloucester: in 1929 Seymour Bathurst, 7th Earl Bathurst, acquired a White Park bull from the Dynevor herd with the aim of increasing the size of his Gloucester cattle at Cirencester Park, which may also have received some intromission of Friesian blood; the Wick Court herd was apparently influenced by the Jersey.

In 1950 the Badminton herd of the Dukes of Beaufort, the largest in the country, was sold off, as was the herd of Colonel Elwes. Only two herds remained, the Bathurst herd at Cirencester Park and that of the Dowdeswell family at Wick Court; together they numbered about fifty head. In 1966 the Bathurst stock was sold off, and the breed society became dormant; in 1972 the Wick Court herd, the last remaining, was also dispersed.

In 1973 the Gloucester Cattle Society was revived under the patronage of Henry Bathurst, 8th Earl Bathurst, with help from the new Rare Breeds Survival Trust, which was formed in the same year. A new herd-book was started; the first volume, printed in 1975, listed about seventy cattle, including twelve originating in the Bathurst herd. Some cattle were exhibited at the Three Counties Show in 1974.

The number of breeding cows had risen to about 500 by 2007. In 2008 the breed was listed by the Rare Breeds Survival Trust as "at risk". In 2021, the trust reported that the number of herds had fallen from 54 to 26 between 2006 and 2020; in its 2021–2022 watchlist it listed the Gloucester as "priority".

The Old Gloucester is included in the Ark of Taste of the Slow Food Foundation.

== Characteristics ==
The Gloucester is of medium size, cows standing some 500–600 kg at the withers and bulls about 750–850 kg. The standard colouration is mahogany or black-brown on the body, with black legs and head, and with characteristic white finching along the spine, down through the tail, and along the belly; bulls are generally darker than cows. Since 1972 colour has been considerably more variable, ranging from light red to black. The horns are white and spreading, with upturned black tips.

== Use ==
The average milk yield is about 3860 litres per lactation; some cows may give up to 5000 litres. Lactation lasts close to 300 days. The milk has an average butterfat content of 3.9%, with 3.3% protein and 4.6% lactose, and is suitable for cheese-making. It is used to make both Single Gloucester and Stinking Bishop cheeses. Under European Union legislation, Single Gloucester had Protected Designation of Origin status, which required that the cheese be made in Gloucestershire, and either did or did not require that the milk used be from Gloucester cows.
