= Wedding ring cushion =

Small pillow on which the wedding rings are carried

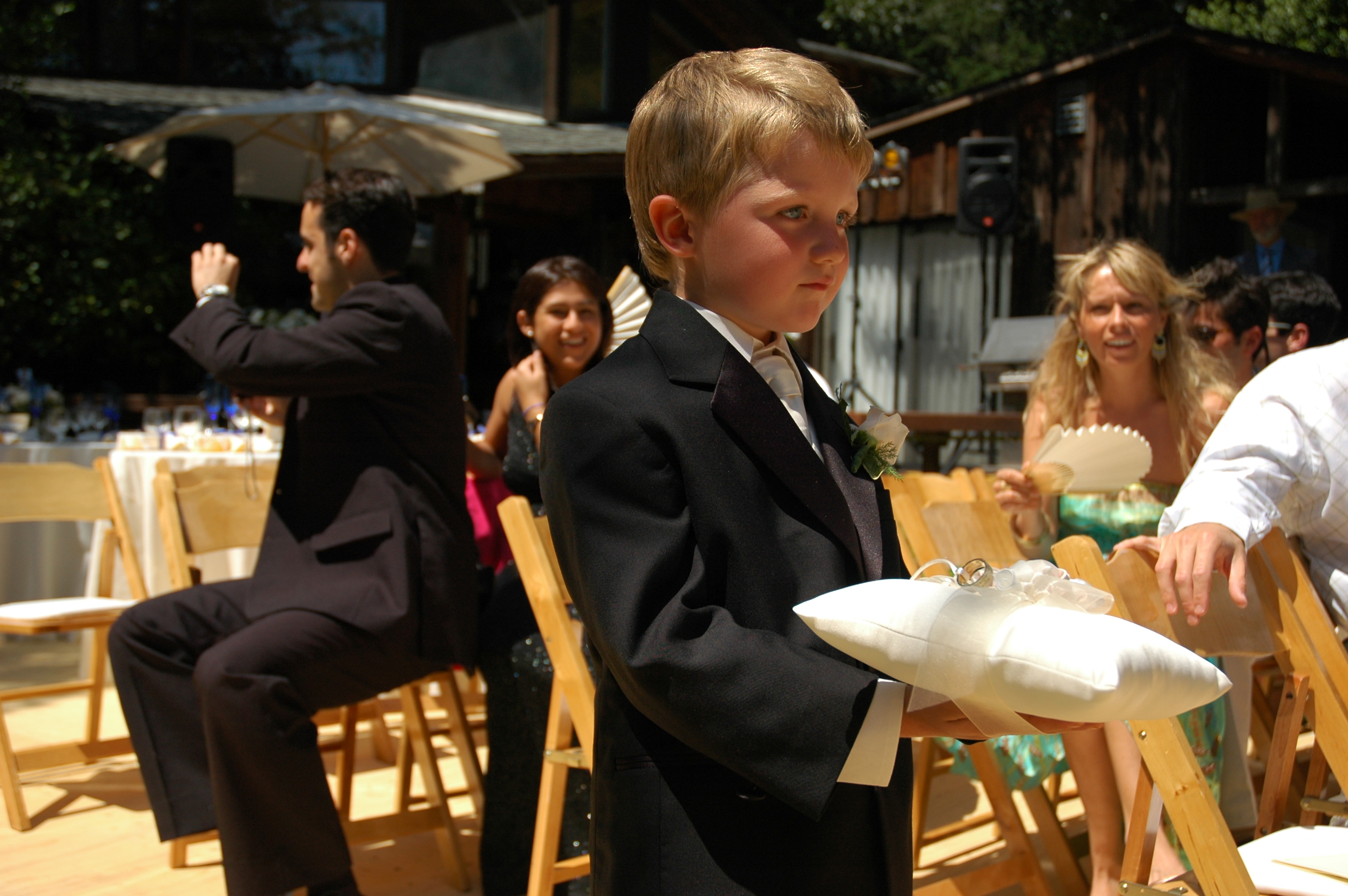
A ringbearer holding a wedding ring on a cushion

A wedding ring cushion or ring bearer pillow is a small pillow on which the wedding rings are carried in a traditional Western white wedding. They are frequently carried by a junior member of the bridal party known as the ringbearer frequently a younger male relative or friend.

During the process, the ringbearer carries the rings on the pillow down the aisle to the officiant.

Wedding ring cushions are generally small, ornate pillows that reflect the wedding's colors or white silk pillows. In less traditional Western weddings they can be whimsical or thematic containers that reflect the couple's personal tastes, or re-use fabrics with sentimental significance, such as a wedding or baptismal gown. The pillow itself may be passed along to other family members for their weddings.
