= Pinzgauer cattle =

Breed of cattle

Pinzgauer
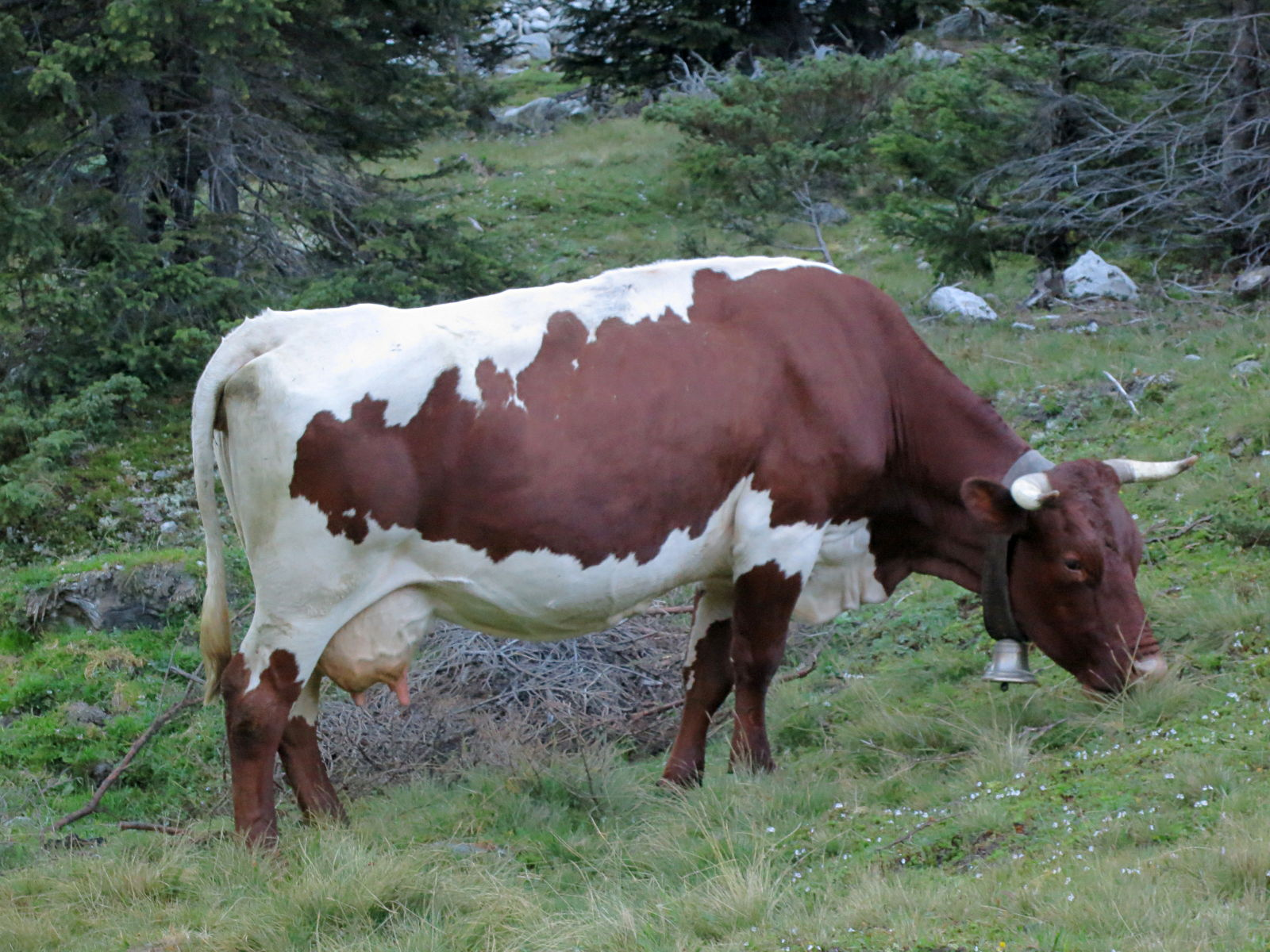
- A Pinzgauer cow in the Achental, Tyrol, Austria
- Conservation status: FAO (2007): not at risk
- Other names: Pinzgau
- Country of origin: Austria
- Distribution: Australia; Botswana; Brazil; Germany; Honduras; Italy; Namibia; Romania; South Africa; Ukraine; United Kingdom; United States
- Standard: MIPAAF (Italy)
- Use: formerly triple-purpose, meat, milk and draught

Traits
- Weight: Male: 1000 kg; Female: 650 kg
- Height: Male: 147 cm; Female: 138 cm
- Coat: dark mahogany red, with a broad white stripe along the back and underparts
- Horn status: usually horned; there is a hornless sub-type

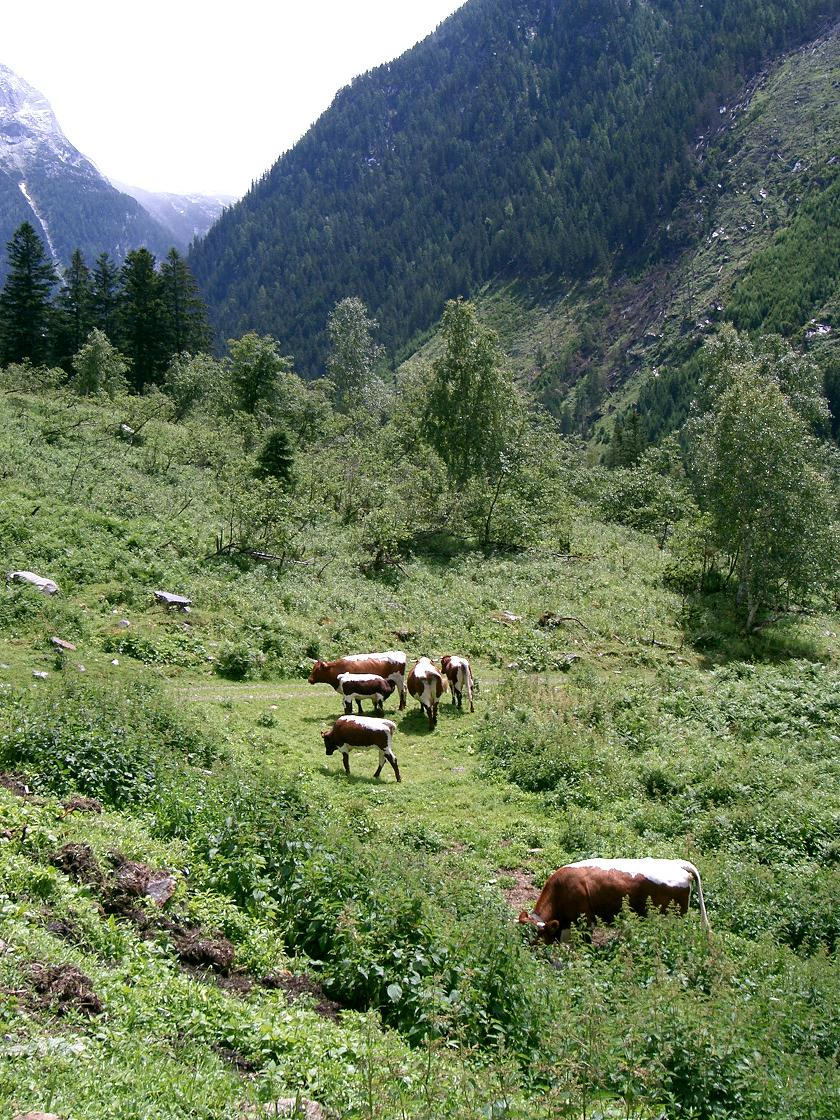
Pinzgauer cattle in the Alps

The Pinzgauer (German pronunciation: [ˈpɪntsˌɡaʊɐ]) is a breed of domestic cattle from the Pinzgau region of the federal state of Salzburg in Austria. It has distinctive colouring, with chestnut-brown sides and white back and underside. It was in the past a triple-purpose breed, raised for meat, milk and draught use. There is a naturally polled sub-type, the Jochberg Hummel. In 2007 the breed was not considered by the FAO to be at risk.

== History ==
According to genetic and morphological studies, the Pinzgauer cattle breed is most closely related to North German lowland breeds.

The Pinzgauer was first referred to as a breed in 1846, and prior to this called "Pinzgauer Fasel" or "Pinzgauer Schlag". In the 19th century, they were bred into strong stock for work on farms, at breweries, and in sugar-beet areas. In its heyday, the Pinzgauer became the most popular cattle breed in Austria-Hungary, subsequently expanding through Eastern Europe. The Bavarian Pinzgauer Cattle Breeding Association was founded in 1896. By December 1890, the Pinzgauer population had grown to 101,880 in Bavaria, but it eventually collapsed as a result of industrialization after World War I. Demand for the cattle decreased, and the breed was replaced by better milk-producing breeds such as Fleckvieh cattle. By 1930, Bavaria had only 85,000 Pinzgauer cattle.

A naturally polled type, the Jochberger Hummel, was considered a separate breed until 1997, when it was merged into the Pinzgauer herd book. These cattle descend from a single, almost totally white calf that was born in 1834 in Tyrol. They were considered crippled and useless because they could not put on a yoke. Now Pinzgauer are not yoked, and the hornless breed is well adapted to modern husbandry. There are now fewer than 50 hornless Pinzgauer cattle in the world, so the type is endangered. Since 1988, there have only been two hornless bulls at the insemination station near Salzburg.

== Characteristics ==
The animals are auburn in colour. A luscious chestnut-colour is the breeding target. Black animals have occurred, but rarely, and were once seen as a curse. After 1900, black bulls were removed from the breeding system, and the black colour vanished. All Pinzgauers have the typical finched pattern in common: a broad white stripe lengthwise along the whole back. The abdomen, chest, udder, and tail are white as well.

The weight of cows ranges from 600 to 700 kg, and cows average 137 cm in height. Bull weight ranges from 1000 to 1100 kg, and bull height is 147 cm on average.

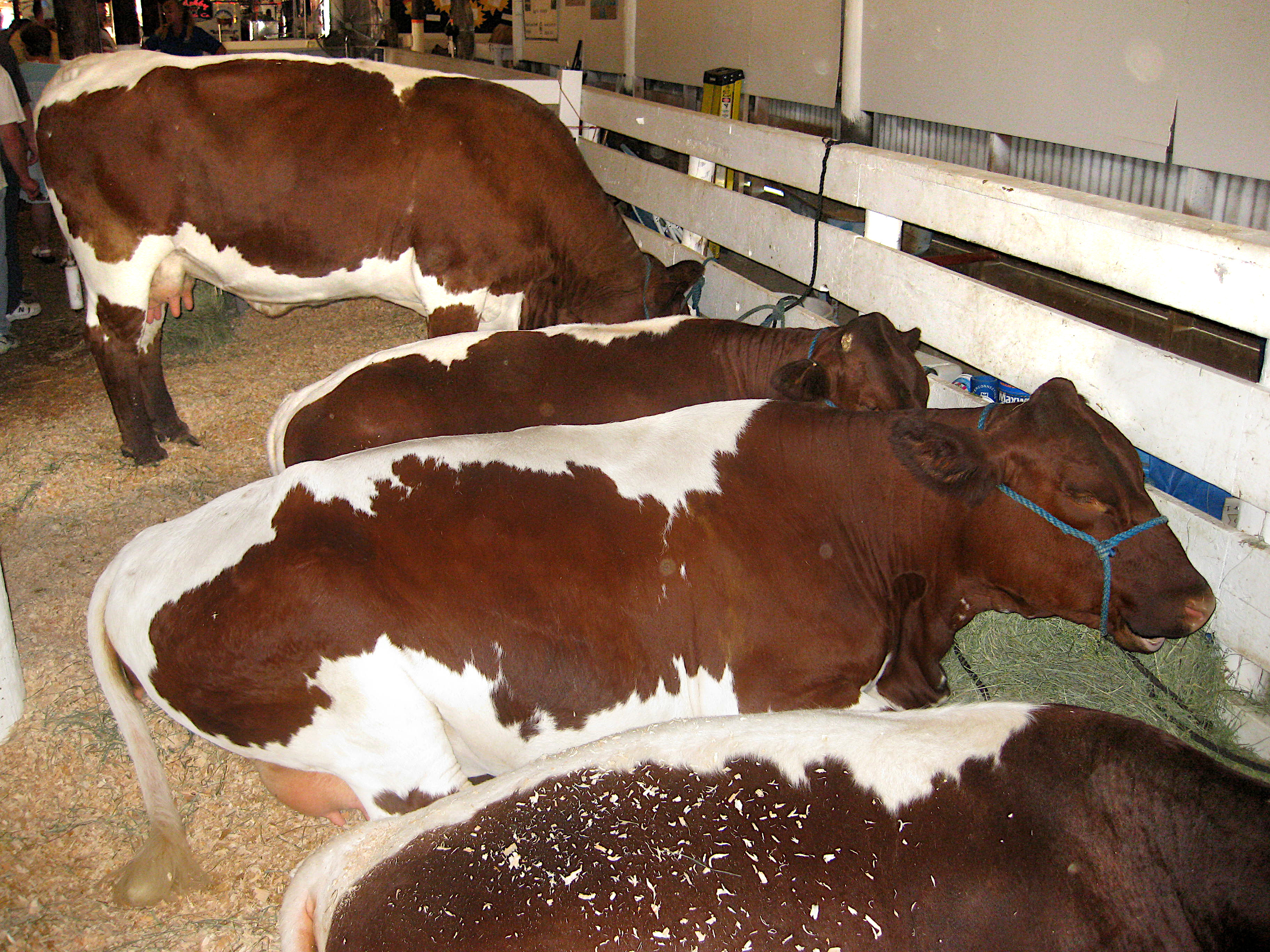
Pinzgauer cows at a fair in the US

== Population and performance ==
The Pinzgauer breed is considered endangered, and the population decreases about 10% per year. In 2001 there were 36,000 animals in Germany, and worldwide there were around 1.3 million. In Austria in 1995 there were 53,874 animals, 9,883 of which were registered in stud books.

Two conflicting tendencies caused the current rarity of purebred, high-performance animals. The Pinzgauer is mainly bred as a beef suckler cow, so there is no selection on milk performance. However, there are utility crossings with local or distinct beef breeds, too. In Austria itself, since 1969, Red Holstein have been crossed into Pinzgauer to increase the milk performance. The aim is to achieve 6,000 kg milk with 4% milk fat content and 3.5% protein. The average milk performance in Austria is 5,356 kg milk with 3.89% milk fat and 3.28% protein (2005).
