= Welsh Black cattle =

Cattle breed

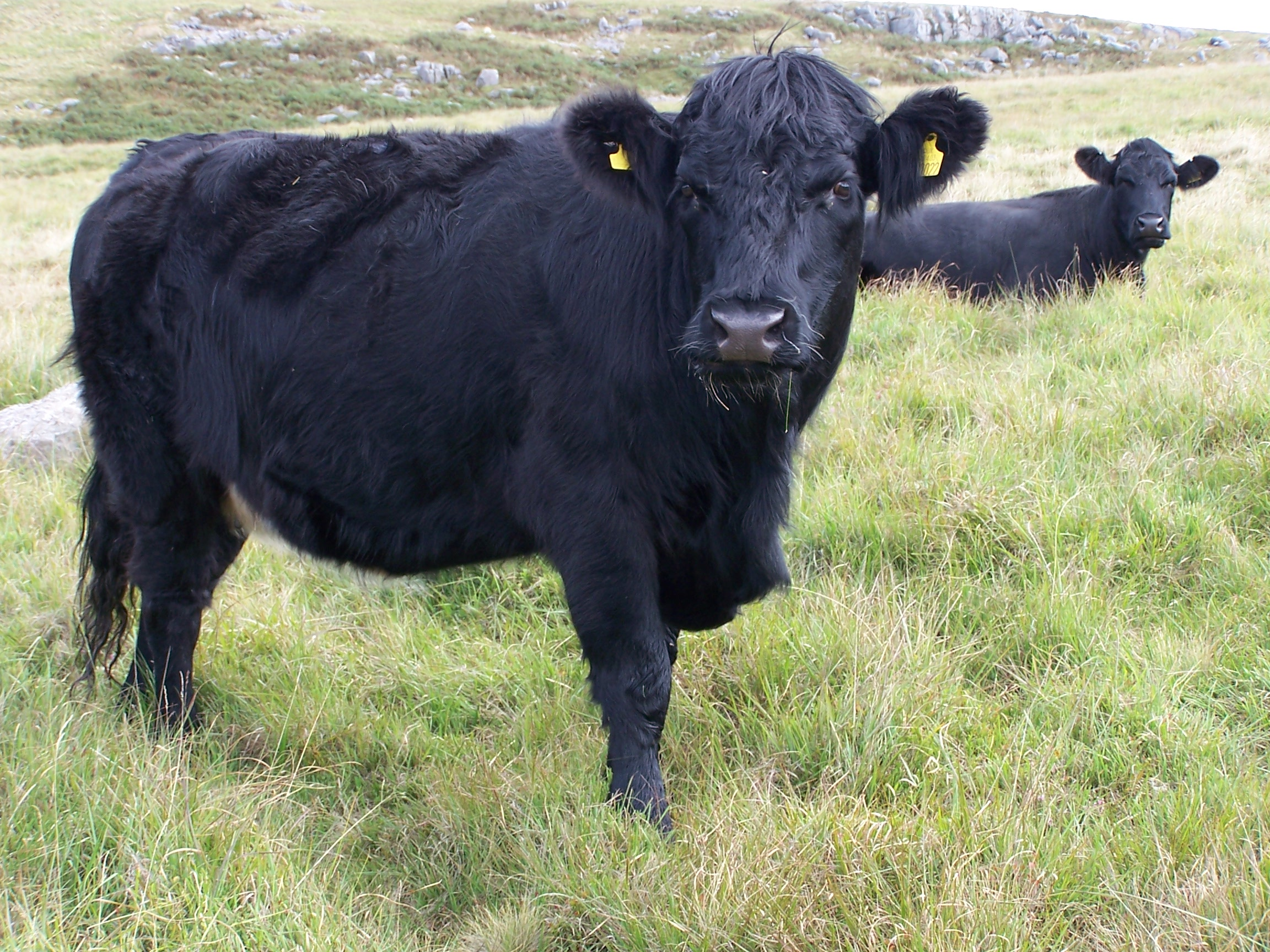
Welsh black cattle near Penderyn

The Welsh Black (Welsh: Gwartheg Duon Cymreig) is a dual-purpose breed of cattle native to Wales. This breed is one of the oldest in Britain, going back to pre-Roman times. The Welsh Black was a prized possession of Britain's people upon the invasion of the Saxons.

== History ==
Commercial exploitation of the breed meant that drovers would drive them to English markets. Herds from south west Wales travelled towards Hereford and Gloucester up the Tywi Valley to Llandovery. Herds from South Cardiganshire reached Llandovery through Llanybydder and Llansawel. The drovers would then return to Wales with large amounts of money, which made them targets of bandits and highwaymen. The result was the formation in 1799 of the Banc yr Eidon in Llandovery, the Bank of the Black Ox, which was later purchased by Lloyds Bank.

By the turn of the nineteenth century, 25,000 cattle were being exported from Wales every year. Before the 1960s, few cattle were exported outside the UK, but now can be found in Canada, New Zealand, Australia and Germany as well in Saudi Arabia, Jamaica and Uganda.

Welsh Black cattle are on the list of endangered native breeds in Wales. Through 1970 this breed served a true dual purpose as there were two subspecies in the country. The Northern Wales subspecies was a stocky breed used for its meat, while the southern subspecies was a more dairy-like breed. As the modern demand for beef has increased a more hybrid species has been developed, which fits traditional needs and the modern demand for beef.

=== Cornish Black ===
It has been speculated that the extinct black cattle of Cornwall was a breed closely related to the Welsh Black. In the nineteenth century they were described as being the same size.

== Characteristics ==
As the name suggests, the cattle are naturally black. They generally have white horns with black tips, but these may be removed, and there are also naturally hornless (polled) strains. Red individuals occur occasionally – red and other colours were more common in the past.

Its hardy nature coupled with its habit of browsing as well as grazing makes it ideal for rough pasture such as heathland and moorland, and for conservation grazing.

Traditionally bred for both milk and beef, commercially it is now usually used only for beef.

== See also ==
- Gwragedd Annwn
