= William Youatt =

English veterinary surgeon and animal welfare writer (1776–1847)

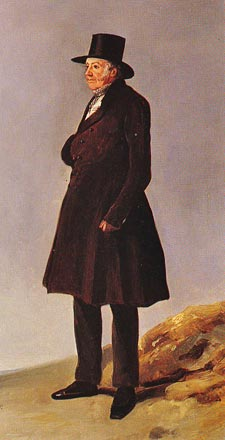
- Portrait of William Youatt, by Richard Ansdell
- Born: 1776
- Died: January 9, 1847 (aged 70–71)
- Occupations: Veterinary surgeon, animal welfare writer
- Children: Elizabeth Youatt

William Youatt (1776 – 9 January 1847) (Note: The Dictionary of National Biography incorrectly gives Youatt's date of death as 5 February, but the inquest into his death was held on 14 January and reported in the newspaper the following day.) was an English veterinary surgeon and animal welfare writer.

== Life ==
Youatt was the son of a non-conformist minister. He was educated for the nonconformist ministry, and undertook ministerial and scholastic duties in London. He was in Chichester, Sussex by 1803, when he married Mary Payne on 12 December at All Saints Chichester. At some uncertain date, in 1812 or 1813, he joined Delabere Pritchett Blaine (1768–1848) in conducting a veterinary infirmary in Wells Street, Oxford Street. This partnership continued for a little more than twelve years, when the business passed into Youatt's hands.

In 1828, Youatt began to deliver a series of lectures and demonstrations to veterinary students at his private residence and infirmary in Nassau Street. These were independent of, and to some extent designed to supplement, the teaching of the London Veterinary College. From the end of 1830 these lectures were delivered at University College London. In 1835 they were abandoned, but instead Youatt continued for four years to print a monthly series of written lectures in the Veterinarian, a professional monthly which he had started in 1828. In this venture he was soon joined by William Percivall, veterinary surgeon to the 1st life guards. This journal, which was still in existence in 1900, was kept alive in the early years only by Youatt's dogged perseverance, at a time when even his co-editor, Percivall, wished to abandon the venture.

During 1835 Youatt was appointed as the Honorary Veterinarian Surgeon of the Society for the Prevention of Cruelty to Animals (later the RSPCA). He was an entrant in an essay-writing competition in 1837 where a benefactor of the RSPCA offered a prize of one hundred pounds for the best piece:

The Essay required is one which shall morally illustrate, and religiously enforce, the obligation of man towards the inferior and dependent creatures—their protection and security from abuse, more especially as regards those engaged in service, and for the use and benefit of mankind—on the sin of cruelty—the infliction of wanton or unnecessary pain, taking the subject under its various denominations—exposing the specious defence of vivisection on the ground of its being for the interests of science—the supplying the infinite demands on the poor animal in aid of human speculations by exacting extreme labour, and thereby causing excessive suffering—humanity to the brute as harmonious with the spirit and doctrines of Christianity, and the duty of man as a rational and accountable creature.

Youatt's essay was not selected as the winning entry. Nevertheless he arranged for the publication of his work which was released as The Obligation and Extent of Humanity to Brutes. Youatt's book prompted an extensive review by William Karkeek in The Veterinarian in 1839 on the subject of animal souls and the afterlife.

In 1838 the Royal Agricultural Society of England had been founded under the title of the English Agricultural Society. Youatt was one of the original members, and was placed on the committee of management. Here he obtained the appointment of a veterinary committee, of which he was appointed chairman, and attempted with considerable success to draw closer the connection between the Society and the Royal Veterinary College.

Owing partly to his extensive literary work, partly to attacks of gout, Youatt's practice had devolved more and more on his assistant, Ainsley, on whose death in 1844 the establishment in Nassau Street was broken up. Youatt, though now standing at the head of his profession, was not a registered member of it; he objected to the constitution of the examining body of the Royal College of Veterinary Surgeons, which consisted chiefly of physicians and surgeons. When, however, in 1844, this body was remodelled, and composed chiefly of veterinarians, Youatt, being then nearly seventy years old, presented himself for examination. The difficulty occasioned by his refusal to answer a professional question rather impertinently put to him was overruled by the chairman, who handed him his diploma on the spot.

Youatt had four daughters, including the novelist Elizabeth Youatt, who was to later marry the secretary of the Royal College of Veterinary Surgeons.

== Death ==
Youatt died by suicide on 9 January 1847, after being "very low in spirits for the last three months". According to the coroner's inquest, Youatt poisoned himself with prussic acid, which was found in a vial on his writing table, and confirmed to be in his stomach by the laboratory at University College London.

== Legacy ==
William Youatt's 1834 book on cattle is noted as an influence on Charles Darwin's work on natural selection soon thereafter, due to Youatt's understanding of artificial selection in animal breeding. Youatt described the selection of close kin of slaughtered animals with desirable characteristics for future breeding.

== Works ==
In 1830 Youatt entered into an arrangement with the Society for the Diffusion of Useful Knowledge to write a series of handbooks on the breeds, management, and diseases of the different animals of the farm. The volumes continued to appear at irregular intervals during the ensuing ten years. In 1839 a testimonial was presented to Youatt by various members of the veterinary profession as a mark ‘of the high esteem they entertain of his literary labours in veterinary science.’ A full account of the proceedings appeared in the ‘Veterinarian’ (xii. 595–619), and is noteworthy by reason of the long autobiographical speech in which Youatt traced the growth of veterinary literature in his time.

Youatt's works include:

- Canine Madness, 1830 (practically a reprint of articles which had been issued in the Veterinarian).
- The Horse (with a treatise on draught, by Isambard Kingdom Brunel), 1831; new edit. 1843 (to this work was added in the posthumous editions an appendix by William Charles Spooner, bringing the work up to date).
- Cattle, their Breeds, Management, and Diseases, 1834. With this subject Youatt was at the time much less familiar than with the treatment of the diseases of horses, and the veterinary part of the work is to be regarded rather as a well-digested compilation than as an original treatise.
- Youatt, William (1837). Sheep, their breeds, management, and diseases, to which is added the Mountain Shepherd's Manual. London: Baldwin and Cradock.
- The Obligation and Extent of Humanity to Brutes, Principally Considered with Reference to the Domesticated Animals, 1839.
- The Dog, 1845. This, like his previous works on the horse, cattle, and sheep, formed part of the Library of Useful Knowledge. It was also reprinted as part of Knight's Farmers' Library, and again in 1852 (Youatt, William (1852). Lewis, E.J (ed.). The Dog. Philadelphia: Blanchard and Lea..)
- The Pig: a Treatise on the Breeds, Management, Feeding, and Medical Treatment of Swine; with Directions for salting Pork and curing Bacon and Hams, 1847; new edit. 1860, enlarged and rewritten by Samuel Sidney. On the title-page of the 1847 edition of this work, which was issued after his death, Youatt is referred to as the editor of the Complete Grazier, and later editions—that of Robert Scott Burn in 1877 and of William Fream in 1893—refer to the work as Youatt's. The book was, however, first compiled in the eighteenth century. The sixth edition (1833) and seventh (1839) are supposed to have been edited by Youatt, though intrinsic evidence for this is lacking.

Youatt also wrote much in the Veterinarian, and made some contributions to the Journal of the Royal Agricultural Society.
