= List of Italian sheep breeds =

This is a list of some of the breeds of sheep considered in Italy to be wholly or partly of Italian origin. Some may have complex or obscure histories, so inclusion here does not necessarily imply that a breed is predominantly or exclusively Italian.

== Principal breeds ==
- Alpagota
- Altamurana
- Appenninica
- Bagnolese
- Barbaresca
- Bergamasca
- Biellese
- Brentegana
- Brianzola
- Brigasca
- Brogna
- Ciavenasca
- Ciuta
- Comisana
- Cornella Bianca
- Cornigliese
- Corteno
- Delle Langhe
- Fabrianese
- Finarda
- Frabosana
- Garessina
- Garfagnina Bianca
- Gentile di Puglia
- Istriana (Carsolina)
- Lamon
- Laticauda
- Leccese
- Livo
- Marrana
- Massese
- Matesina
- Merinizzata Italiana
- Nera di Arbus
- Modenese
- Nostrana
- Noticiana
- Pagliarola
- Pinzirita
- Plezzana
- Pomarancina
- Pusterese
- Quadrella
- Rosset
- Saltasassi
- Sambucana
- Sarda
- Savoiarda
- Schnalserschaf
- Schwarzbraunes Bergschaf
- Sciara
- Sopravissana
- Tacola
- Tiroler Bergschaf
- Trimeticcia Segezia
- Turchessa
- Valle del Belice
- Varesina
- Vicentina
- Villnösser Schaf
- Vissana
- Zerasca
- Zucca Modenese

== Minor breeds ==
The minor sheep breeds of Italy include:

- Barisciano, or Aquilana (Abruzzo)
- Bellunese (Veneto)
- Borgotarese (Emilia-Romagna)
- Cadorina (Veneto)
- Campidano, or Cagliari Sardegna
- Carapellese, or Gentile moretta, Gentile a vello nero, Merino nera, Moretta
- Carnica (Friuli-Venezia Giulia)
- Casciana (Tuscany)
- Casentinese (Tuscany)
- Chersolina
- Chianina, or Val di Chiana (Tuscany)
- Chietina (Lazio)
- Cinta (Lombardy)
- Cornetta (Emilia-Romagna)
- Della Roccia or Steinschaf, Pecora delle rocce, Pecora dei sassi, Carinthia, Tirolese (Trentino-Alto Adige)
- Di montagna
- Fasanese
- Fiemmese, or Val di Fiemme (Trentino-Alto Adige)
- Friulana, or Furlana (Friuli-Venezia Giulia)
- Gentile di Calabria, or Migliorata di Calabria (Calabria)
- Gentile di Lucania, or Migliorata di Lucania (Basilicata)
- Giupanna, or Ragusa-Sipan (Sicily)
- Maremmana, or Bastarda maremmana, Bastarda spagnola (Tuscany, Lazio)
- Noventana, Monselesana, Pecora di Monselice
- Padovana (Veneto)
- Pecora del Jura
- Perugina di pianura (Umbria)
- Reggiana (Emilia-Romagna)
- Sampeyrina
- Senese, or Senese delle Crete (Tuscany)
- Tarina
- Urbascia
- Val Badia, Badiota (Trentino-Alto Adige)
- Varzese
