= Nostrana =

Breed of sheep

- Country of origin: Italy

Traits
- Weight: Male: 79 kg; Female: 50–55 kg
- Wool color: white
- Face color: white

Notes
- dual-purpose: meat and wool

The Nostrana is a breed of sheep from the area of the Passo della Cisa, the Apennine pass which connects the comune of Pontremoli in the province of Massa Carrara, Tuscany, with that of Berceto in the province of Parma, in Emilia–Romagna. The Nostrana appears to be closely related to the Garfagnina Bianca, and probably also to the Cornigliese and Zerasca breeds. It is one of the forty-two autochthonous local sheep breeds of limited distribution for which a herdbook is kept by the Associazione Nazionale della Pastorizia, the Italian national association of sheep-breeders.

In 2013 total numbers for the breed were not reported; 300 head were counted in 1983. The herdbook has been empty for a number of years; the breed may be extinct.
