= Zucca Modenese =

Italian breed of sheep

- Conservation status: FAO (2007): extinct; DAD-IS (2026): not listed
- Country of origin: Italy
- Distribution: Province of Modena; Province of Ferrara
- Use: triple-purpose: meat, milk, wool

Traits
- Weight: Male: 70–80 kg; Female: 50–60 kg
- Height: Male: 80–90 cm; Female: 70–75 cm
- Wool colour: white
- Face colour: white

The Zucca Modenese is an Italian breed of domestic sheep. It is distributed principally in the province of Modena in Emilia-Romagna, in northern Italy, but was formerly present also in the provinces of Bologna, Ferrara and Reggio Emilia. It was identified during a census by the Consiglio Nazionale delle Ricerche in 1983. It is one of three endangered breeds of sheep in the province of Modena; the others are the Cornella Bianca and the Modenese or Balestra.

== History ==
The Zucca Modenese is thought to derive from cross-breeding or inter-breeding of the local sheep populations of the Province of Modena with rams of breeds of the Veneto – such as the Alpagota and the Lamon – during the winter months when flocks of both were moved to lowland pastures in the provinces of Ferrara and Rovigo. The Zucca Modenese has a high incidence of crop ear, a characteristic shared with some breeds of the Veneto.

The total population was estimated in 1983 at between 100 and 200 head; in the twenty-first century it may consist only of a few scattered individuals, or may be extinct. It was listed as extinct by the Food and Agriculture Organization of the United Nations in 2007, and in 2026 was not among the breeds reported to the DAD-IS database. It is not among the forty-two autochthonous local sheep breeds of limited distribution for which a flock-book is kept by the Associazione Nazionale della Pastorizia, the Italian national association of sheep-breeders.

== Characteristics ==
The Zucca Modenese is of medium size: ewes stand some 70 to 75 cm at the withers and weigh between 50 and 60 kg, while rams weigh from 70 to 80 kg and stand between 80 and 90 cm at the shoulder. The sheep are polled in both sexes; the facial profile is somewhat convex, particularly in rams. The ears are pendent and of medium size; they may be incompletely developed.

== Use ==
It is a triple-purpose breed, reared for meat, for milk and for wool. The milk yield – excluding that taken by the lambs – is some 80 to 100 kg in a lactation of 90–120 days. Lambs were traditionally slaughtered at a weight of about 10 kg. The wool yield is low, at approximately 1.5 kg in two shearings.
