= Corteno =

Breed of sheep

- Conservation status: FAO (2007): endangered-maintained
- Other names: Pecora di Corteno
- Country of origin: Italy
- Distribution: Val Camonica
- Standard: MIPAAF
- Use: meat

Traits
- Weight: Male: 70 kg; Female: 60 kg
- Height: Male: 77 cm; Female: 73 cm
- Wool color: white
- Face color: white
- Horn status: hornless in both sexes

The Corteno or Pecora di Corteno is a breed of sheep from the Val Camonica, in the province of Brescia in Lombardy, northern Italy. It is raised in the comune of Corteno Golgi, from which it takes its name, and in the neighbouring comuni of Edolo, Malonno and Paisco Loveno, all lying within the Comunità Montana di Valle Camonica. It is one of the forty-two autochthonous local sheep breeds of limited distribution for which a herdbook is kept by the Associazione Nazionale della Pastorizia, the Italian national association of sheep-breeders.

== History ==
The origin of the Corteno breed is unknown, but is probably shared with that of other lop-eared breeds of the Alpine region such as the Bergamasca, the Biellese and the Lamon. Numbers were estimated at 4000 in 1983, and at about 1600 in 1995. In 2006 the total number was estimated at 1500, of which 131 were registered in the herdbook. The conservation status of the breed was listed as "critical" by the Food and Agriculture Organization of the United Nations in 2007. In 2013 the number registered for the breed was 295.

== Use ==
The meat of the Corteno is exceptionally fatty. It is traditionally used to produce Cuz, a local type of preserved meat. Whole carcases of wether mutton are boiled in a cauldron for five or six hours with salt and a little water; the meat is then put up in terracotta jars with more salt and sealed with the mutton-fat.
