= Brogna =

Italian breed of sheep

- Conservation status: FAO (2007): endangered
- Other names: Brogne; Brognola; Locale veronese; Ross-a-vis; Testa rossa
- Country of origin: Italy
- Distribution: province of Verona
- Standard: MIPAAF
- Use: triple-purpose, milk, meat and wool

Traits
- Weight: Male: 60 kg; Female: 47 kg
- Height: Male: 67 cm; Female: 57 cm
- Skin colour: pinkish
- Wool colour: white
- Face colour: white with red markings
- Horn status: hornless in both sexes

The Brogna or Brogne is an Italian breed of domestic sheep from the province of Verona, in the Veneto in north-eastern Italy. It is well adapted to the local upland environment. The name of the breed may derive from that of the suppressed comune of Breonio, now part of Fumane.

== History ==
The origins of the Brogna are unknown. It is raised principally in Lessinia, the plateau which extends from the Monti Lessini to the Po Valley, in the comuni of Grezzana, Illasi, Mezzane di Sotto, Rovere Veronese, Selva di Progno and Tregnago. This area coincides with an enclave of Cimbrian language and culture, and the origins of the breed may be closely linked to those people, who arrived from Bavaria in the early thirteenth century. Alternatively, the Brogna may have originated as a composite of the Bergamasca and Lamon breeds.

The Brogna is one of the forty-two autochthonous local sheep breeds of limited distribution for which a herdbook is kept by the Associazione Nazionale della Pastorizia, the Italian national association of sheep-breeders.

The area of Verona was formerly famous for its woollen goods, but from the sixteenth century its importance began to decline. Sheep-farming became secondary to cattle-raising in the area; from about 30000 head of sheep on the plateau in the late eighteenth century, numbers had fallen to 5334 in a census of 1881. In the early 1980s a census of the Brogna breed counted 50 head and it was considered to be close to extinction. By 1994 numbers had risen to over 4500. In 2013 total numbers for the breed were 2193.

== Characteristics ==
The Brogna is a medium-sized breed, with rams averaging about 60 kg (130 lb) with a wither height of 67 cm (26 in) and ewes about 47 kg (100 lb) with a wither height of 57 cm (22 in).

== Use ==
The Brogna was traditionally a triple-purpose breed, raised for meat, milk and wool; however the demand for wool is now low and it is raised principally for meat. After the lambs are weaned, ewes yield about 100 kg of milk in 100 days. Lambs reach about 17 kg at 60 days, and are slaughtered at a weight of 15–20 kg.

In a feeding trial of the lambs, comparing them to other regional breeds under three different feeding regimes, the Brogna was found to have more fat and better cooking qualities than the Alpagota but a slower growth rate and smaller carcase size than the Foza. All three breeds were worth preserving to provide regional products to local markets.
