= Brianzola =

Breed of sheep

- Conservation status: FAO (2007): critical
- Country of origin: Italy
- Distribution: province of Como
- Standard: MIPAAF
- Use: meat

Traits
- Weight: Male: 100 kg; Female: 65 kg
- Height: Male: 90 cm; Female: 75 cm
- Wool color: white
- Face color: white
- Horn status: hornless in both sexes

The Brianzola is a breed of sheep from Lombardy in northern Italy. It originates in the historical region of the Brianza, from which it takes its name, and which coincides with the modern provinces of Como, Lecco and Monza and Brianza. It is raised principally in the comuni of Brianza, Civate, Galbiate, Proserpio, Suello and Valmadrera. It is a heavy meat breed; the wool is not used. It is one of the forty-two autochthonous local sheep breeds of limited distribution for which a herdbook is kept by the Associazione Nazionale della Pastorizia, the Italian national association of sheep-breeders.

== History ==
The origins of the breed are unknown, but are probably shared with those of other large lop-eared breeds of the Alps such as the Bergamasca, the Biellese and the Lamon. The much-reported derivation of these breeds from Sudanese sheep is a hypothesis published in 1886 in the Traité de zootechnie of André Sanson, and is based on craniometry; it has no foundation in science. Breed numbers fell drastically in the period after the Second World War, from about 4000 in the war years to 60–80 head in 1983; they have since recovered. The conservation status of the breed was listed as "critical" by the Food and Agriculture Organization of the United Nations in 2007. A total population of 911 was reported in 2008, and in 2013 the total number reported for the breed was 1464, of which all were in the province of Como.
