= Appenninica =

Italian breed of sheep

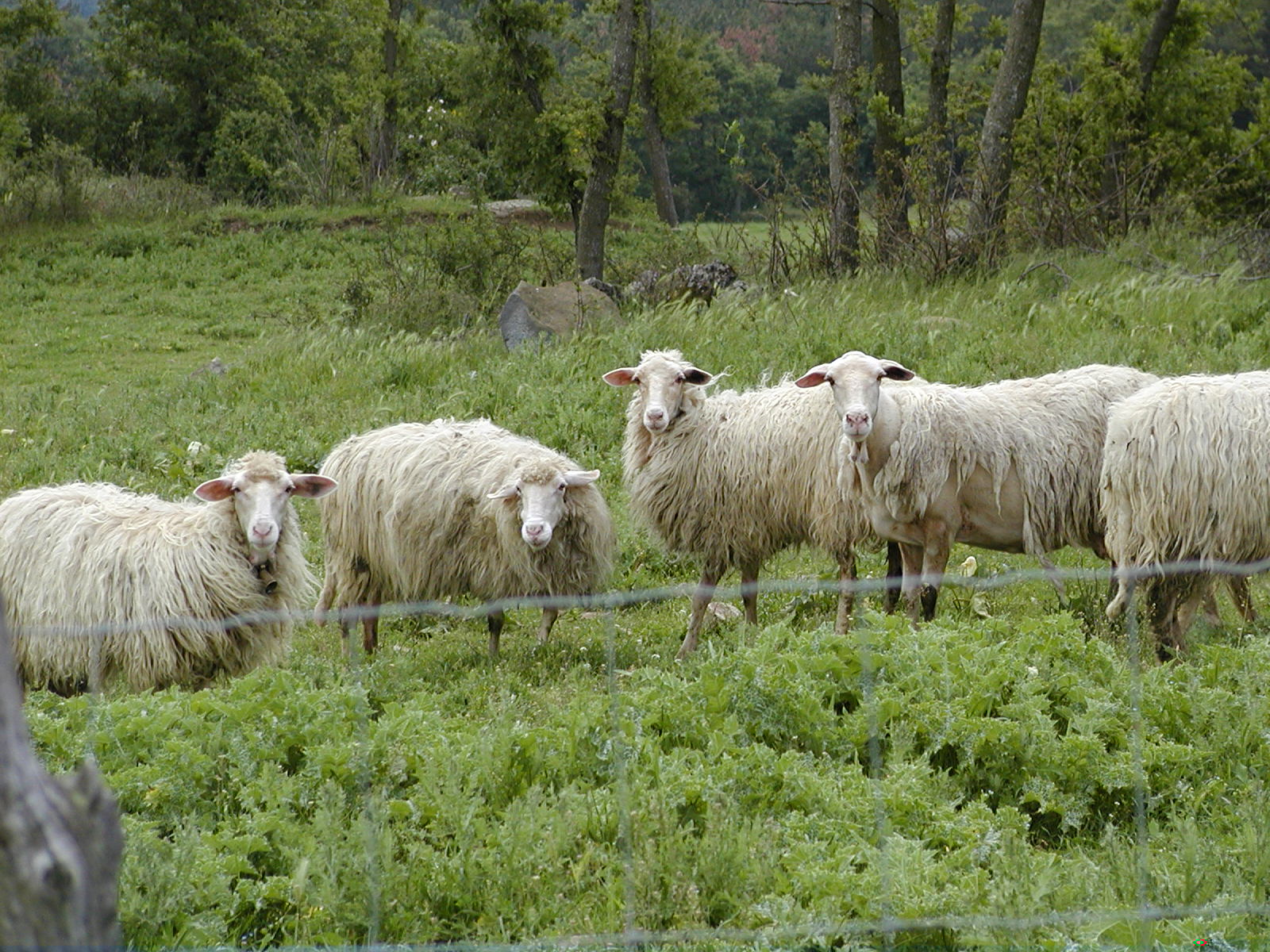
- Conservation status: FAO (2007): not at risk; DAD-IS (2024): not at risk
- Country of origin: Italy
- Distribution: Tuscany; Umbria; Abruzzo; Emilia–Romagna; Lazio; Marche
- Standard: MIPAAF
- Use: meat

Traits
- Weight: Male: 78 kg; Female: 56 kg
- Height: Male: 77 cm; Female: 69 cm
- Skin colour: unpigmented
- Wool colour: white
- Face colour: white
- Horn status: polled in both sexes

The Appenninica is a modern Italian breed of sheep from the central Apennine Mountains. It is raised principally in the regions of Tuscany and Umbria, but also in Abruzzo, Emilia–Romagna, Lazio and the Marche. It was created in the 1970s by cross-breeding and selective breeding of various local sheep of those regions with the Bergamasca and with Ile-de-France and Berrichon du Cher stock from France.

It is a coarse-wool breed, and is raised primarily for meat.

== History ==
The Appenninica was created in the 1970s by cross-breeding and subsequent selection of local breeds – including the Bariscianese, the Casentinese, the Chietina Varzese, the Pagliarola, the Perugina del Piano, the Pomarancina, the Senese delle Creti and the Vissana – with Bergamasca rams and with the French Ile-de-France and Berrichon du Cher. The aim was to increase both the size and the meat yield. It was officially recognised as a breed in 1980, and a herd-book was established in 1981. It is raised principally in the regions of Tuscany and Umbria, but also in the neighbouring regions of Abruzzo, Emilia–Romagna, Lazio and the Marche.

It is one of the seventeen autochthonous Italian sheep breeds for which a genealogical herdbook is kept by the Associazione Nazionale della Pastorizia, the Italian national association of sheep-breeders. From 1993 to 2007, the population of the Appenninica declined from over 160000 to 3438. In 2013 total numbers for the breed were 9791 or 15551; in 2023 the registered population was 7297, with 6447 breeding ewes and 367 rams distributed in 119 flocks.

== Characteristics ==
The Appenninica is polled (hornless) in both sexes; the ears are carried horizontally. The average weight for mature rams is 78 kg (170 lb); average height at the withers is 77 cm (30 in) and average length 79 cm (31 in). When mature, ewes weigh on average 56 kg, are 69 cm at the withers and are 73 cm long.

The breed is well adapted to the terrain of the Apennine Mountains, Emilia and Abruzzo regions of Italy.

== Use ==
The Appenninica is reared principally for meat, usually either for spring lamb or for heavy lambs; lambs weigh about 4.2 kg at birth, about 14 kg at 45 days and about 24 kg at 90 days. The milk yield is some 100–120 kg per lactation, with a fat content of 6%–7%; most of it goes to the lambs, some may be used to make pecorino cheeses.

Rams yield about 2.5 kg (6 lb) of wool while ewes provide 1.5 kg. The mean fibre diameter is 30.6 μ, and the mean staple length 56 mm.
