= Rosset sheep =

Breed of sheep

Rosset
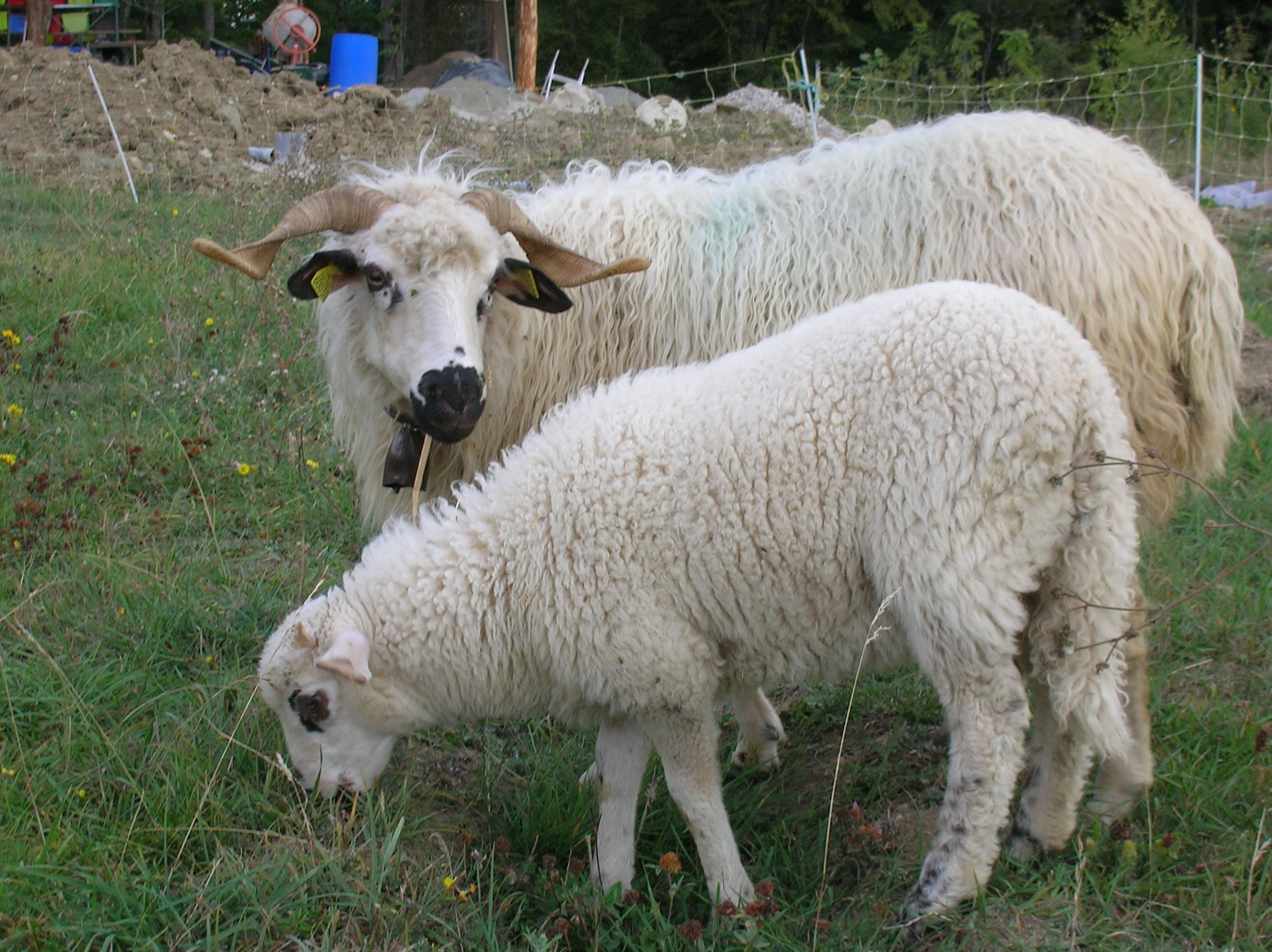
- Country of origin: Italy

Traits
- Weight: Male: 60–70 kg; Female: 50–55 kg
- Wool color: off-white
- Face color: white with reddish markings, black tip to nose, black "spectacles"

Notes
- triple-purpose: meat, milk and wool

The Rosset is a breed of domestic sheep from the Valle d'Aosta in north-west Italy. It is morphologically similar to the Savoiarda breed from Piemonte and to the Thônes et Marthod breed from Savoie; it may have been influenced also by the Blanc des Alpes and the Biellese. It is one of the forty-two autochthonous local sheep breeds of limited distribution for which a herdbook is kept by the Associazione Nazionale della Pastorizia, the Italian national association of sheep-breeders.

In 2013 the total number recorded for the breed was 919.
