= Brentegana =

Italian breed of sheep

- Conservation status: FAO (2007): critical; DAD-IS (2020): at risk
- Other names: Brentegana Scelta; Brentegana Trentina; Brentegana Comune
- Country of origin: Italy
- Standard: MIPAAF
- Type: lop-eared Alpine
- Use: Scelta: dual-purpose, meat and wool; Comune: milk

Traits
- Weight: Male: Scelta: 90–100 kg; Comune: Female: Scelta: 70–80 kg; Comune: 53 kg
- Height: Male: Scelta: 90–95 cm; Comune: Female: Scelta: 80–85 cm; Comune: 71 cm
- Wool colour: white
- Face colour: white
- Horn status: hornless in both sexes

The Brentegana is an Italian breed of sheep from the provinces of Trento and Verona in northern Italy. The name derives from that of the comune of Brentonico, the area where the breed is thought to have originated. Two distinct types are known: the Brentegana Scelta or Brentegana Trentina, a large heavy meat/wool type; and the Brentegana Comune, a medium-sized type more suitable for milk production. It is one of the forty-two autochthonous local sheep breeds of limited distribution for which a herdbook is kept by the Associazione Nazionale della Pastorizia, the Italian national association of sheep-breeders.

== History ==
The ancestry of the breed is not clear: it has been suggested that it derives from the Lamon from the province of Belluno, but this is disputed. It originated in the area to the east of Lake Garda; it is named for its supposed area of origin, the comune of Brentonico in the province of Trento, but is also associated with Monte Baldo and the comuni of Affi and Caprino Veronese in the province of Verona.

The traditional management of the Brentegana was transhumant; flocks were moved the high pastures of the Monte Baldo in May, remaining there until October, when they were brought down and stabled for the winter, feeding on hay; in spring they were moved to lowland pastures in the area of Verona until the return to the mountains for the summer.

In 2013 total numbers for the breed were not recorded. A population of 14 was reported in 2005. The conservation status of the breed was listed as "critical" by the Food and Agriculture Organization of the United Nations in 2007; in 2020 it was reported to DAD-IS as "at risk".

== Characteristics ==
The Brentegana is of lop-eared Alpine type, a polled upland sheep with convex profile and lop ears. It is entirely white. It is well adapted to survival in the marginal mountain environment of its area of origin.

Two distinct types are known: the Brentegana Scelta or Brentegana Trentina, a large heavy meat/wool type; and the Brentegana Comune, a medium-sized type more suitable for milk production. Rams of the Scelta type may weigh 100 kg, and stand almost a metre at the withers.
