= Istriana =

Breed of sheep

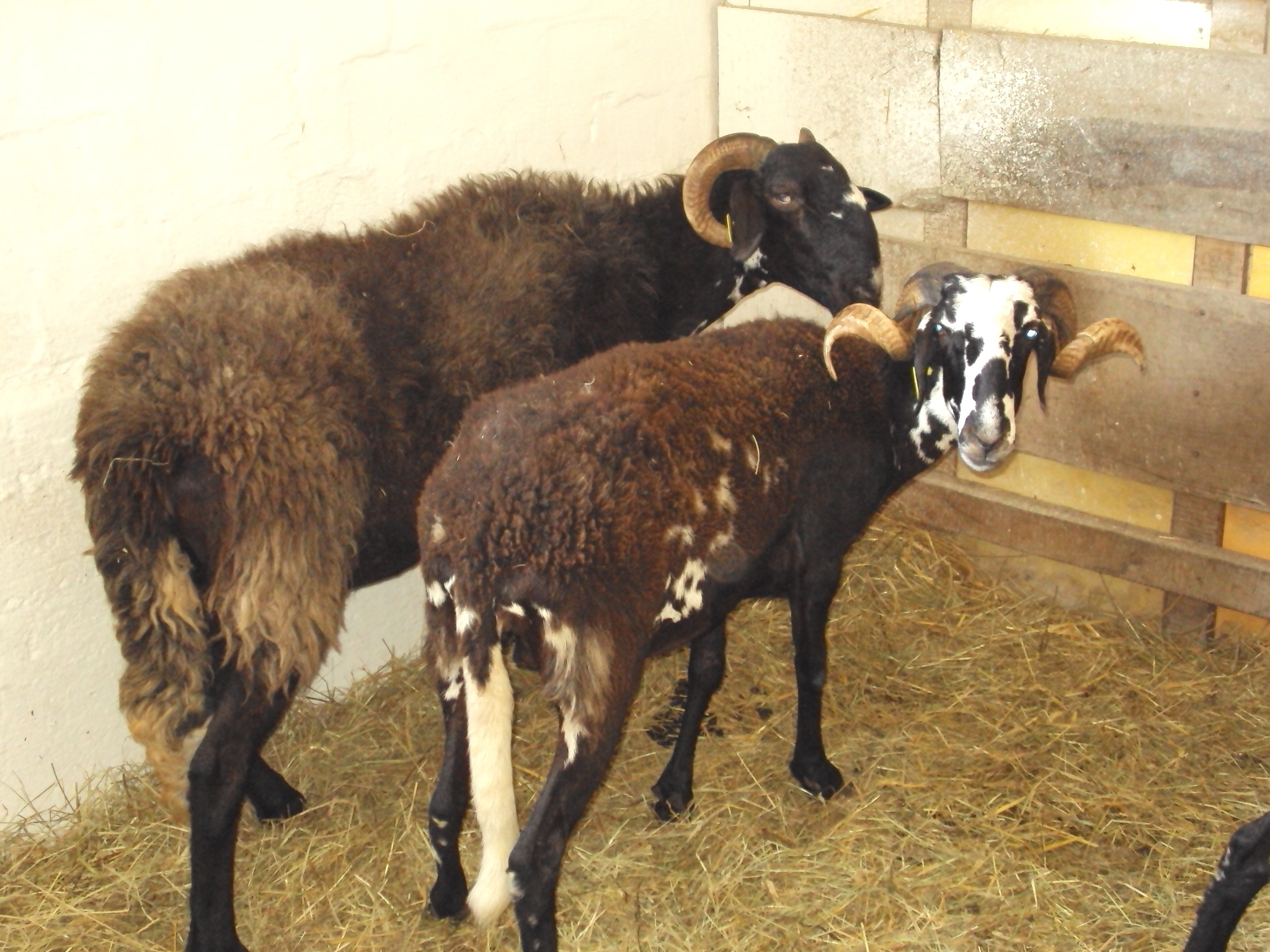
- Conservation status: Croatia: FAO (2007): not at risk; Italy: FAO (2007): endangered; Slovenia: FAO (2007): not at risk
- Other names: Istarska Ovca; Istrska Pramenka; Carsolina
- Country of origin: Italy
- Distribution: province of Gorizia, Italy; province of Pordenone, Italy; province of Trieste, Italy; Croatia; Slovenia
- Standard: MIPAAF
- Use: dual-purpose, milk and meat

Traits
- Weight: Male: 65 kg; Female: 52 kg
- Height: Male: 75–80 cm; Female: 70–75 cm
- Wool color: white
- Face color: mottled with dark brown
- Horn status: spiral horns, females often hornless

The Istriana or Carsolina, Croatian: 'Istarska Ovca', Slovene: 'Istrska Pramenka', is a breed of domestic sheep from Istria and the Karst regions of the northern Adriatic, from north-east Italy to Croatia and Slovenia.

== History ==
The Istriana breed appears to derive from inter-breeding of local Italian stock with breeds from the Balkans, and particularly with animals brought to the area by the Morlachs, Dacian refugees from the Ottoman invasions of the 17th century.

In 1869 the sheep population in Istria was estimated at 160,000; the Istriana was the predominant breed. In the 1980s it was to a large extent supplanted by sheep of pramenka type from Kosovo, Macedonia and Metohija, which had a similar resistance to the harsh conditions of the peninsula, but lower productivity of both milk and meat and lower resistance to disease. Attempts were made to increase the milk yield by cross-breeding with Awassi, East Friesian and Sarda stock. A project for the recovery of the traditional type of Istriana sheep has been launched in Croatia, and involves exchange of genetic material with Italy. A breeders' association, the Associazione degli Allevatori della Pecora Istriana nella Regione Istriana "Istrijanka", was formed at Sanvincenti (Svetvinčenat) in 2005. Breeding stock is estimated at 2300 head. The total number reported for 2013 was 2900–3300; for Slovenia it was 1150.

In Italy, the Istriana is one of the forty-two autochthonous local sheep breeds of limited distribution for which a herdbook is kept by the Associazione Nazionale della Pastorizia, the Italian national association of sheep-breeders. Breed numbers fell drastically in the second half of the 20th century, from 10,000 in 1960 to 250 in 1983. In 2013 total numbers for the breed were recorded as 635.

== See also ==
- Istriana goat
