= Marrana =

Breed of sheep

- Other names: Marrane
- Country of origin: Italy

Traits
- Weight: Male: minimum 80 kg; Female: minimum 70 kg
- Wool color: white
- Face color: white

Notes
- meat

The Marrana or Marrane is a breed of large sheep from the area of Rezzoaglio, in the Val d'Aveto in the province of Genova, in Liguria in north-west Italy. It was formerly a small breed, with an average weight of about 50 kg; the handful of surviving members of the breed are larger, and show strong morphological similarity to the Bergamasca and the Biellese, to such an extent that the integrity of the breed has been questioned. The Marrana is one of the forty-two autochthonous local sheep breeds of limited distribution for which a herdbook is kept by the Associazione Nazionale della Pastorizia, the Italian national association of sheep-breeders.

In 2013 total numbers for the breed were not reported. Recent figures for the number of pure-bred specimens are 17, 12 and 7.
