= Finarda =

Breed of sheep

- Conservation status: FAO (2007): not at risk
- Country of origin: Italy
- Distribution: Lombardy; Piemonte
- Standard: MIPAAF
- Use: principally for meat; also wool

Traits
- Weight: Male: 100–120 kg; Female: 80–100 kg
- Height: Male: 90–100 cm; Female: 85–90 cm
- Wool color: white
- Face color: white
- Horn status: hornless in both sexes

The Finarda is a breed of large domestic sheep from the regions of Lombardy and Piemonte in northern Italy. It is heavy breed raised mainly for meat, although it also yields 4–6 kg of wool per year. It results from cross-breeding the Bergamasca and Biellese breeds. It is one of the forty-two autochthonous local sheep breeds of limited distribution for which a herdbook is kept by the Associazione Nazionale della Pastorizia, the Italian national association of sheep-breeders. However, in 2008 the herdbook was empty, and may in fact never have been activated. Most data for the breed dates from 1983.

The conservation status of the breed was listed as "not at risk" by the Food and Agriculture Organization of the United Nations in 2007. In 2013 total numbers for the breed were not reported; the population is estimated at 5000 head.
