= Tiroler Bergschaf =

Breed of sheep

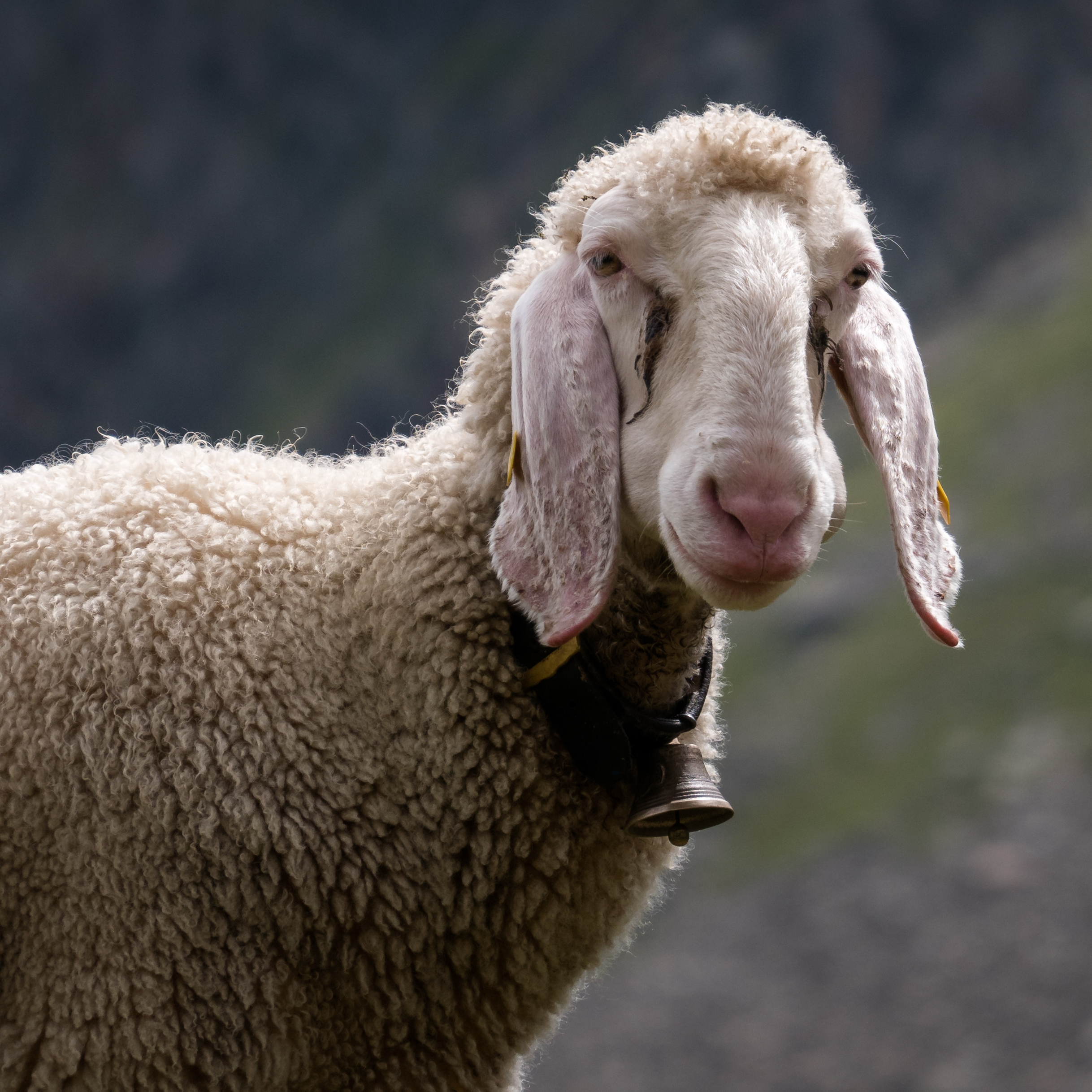
- Other names: Pecora Alpina Tirolese
- Country of origin: Austria; Italy

Traits
- Weight: Male: 80–120 kg; Female: 70–100 kg
- Wool colour: white
- Face colour: white

Notes
- dual-purpose, meat and wool

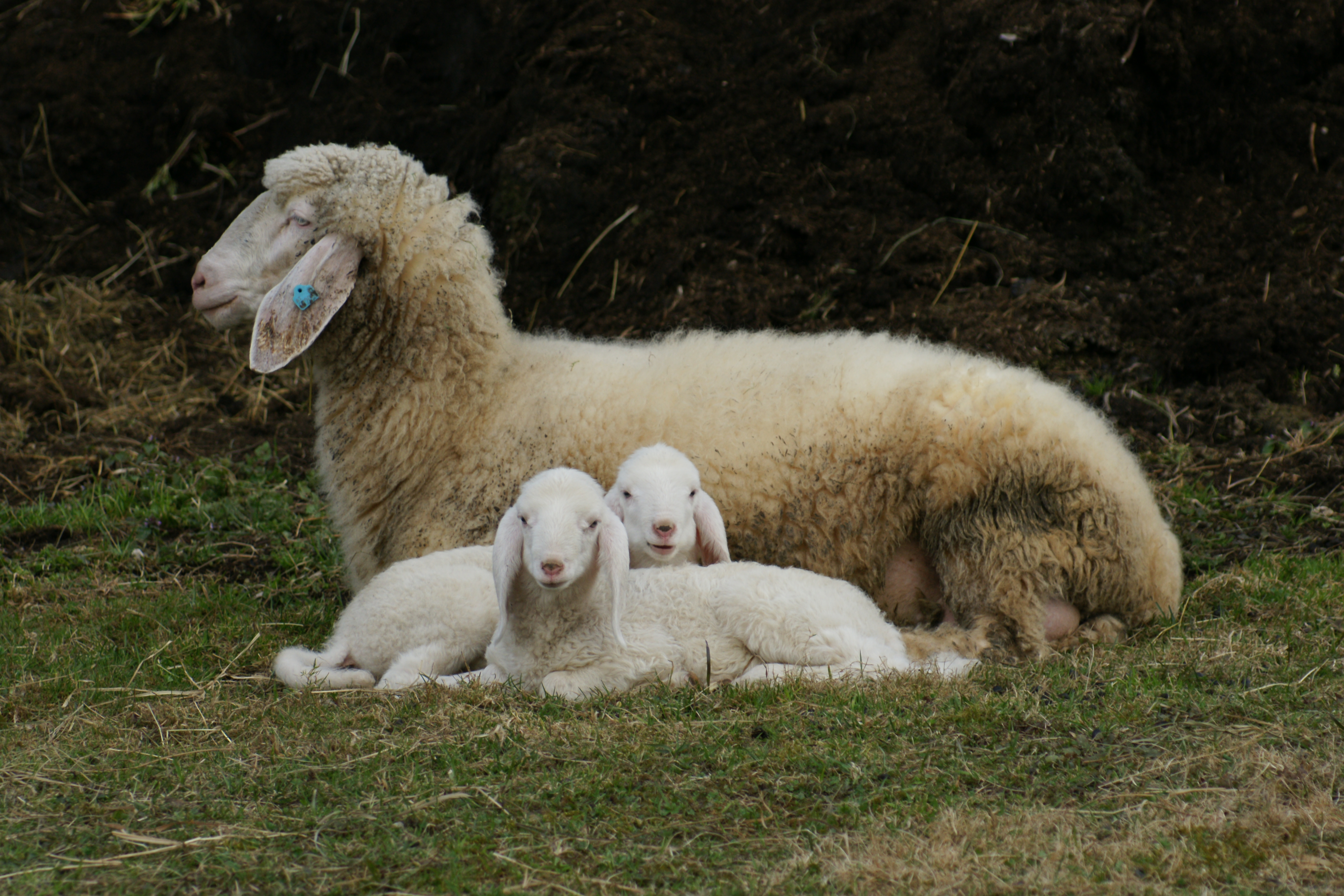
Ewe with twin lambs in Achenkirch am Achensee, in Tyrol in Austria

The Tiroler Bergschaf or Pecora Alpina Tirolese is a breed of domestic sheep from the mountainous Tyrol area of Austria and Italy. The name means "Tyrolean mountain sheep". It is raised throughout Austria and in the autonomous province of Bolzano in Italy. It results from cross-breeding between the Tiroler Steinschaf of the Tyrol with the Italian Bergamasca breed from the area of Bergamo. This is variously reported as having taken place in the first half of the 19th century and after the Second World War.

The Tiroler Bergschaf is one of the forty-two autochthonous local sheep breeds of limited distribution for which a herdbook is kept by the Associazione Nazionale della Pastorizia, the Italian national association of sheep-breeders. In 2013 no total number for the breed was recorded in the herdbook. In 2008 an Italian population of 12888 was reported to DAD-IS.

The Austrian herdbook was opened in 1938; the population reported for Austria in 2012 was 12901 to 19000.
