= Fabrianese =

Italian breed of sheep

- Conservation status: FAO (2007): not at risk; DAD-IS (2024): at risk/endangered
- Country of origin: Italy
- Distribution: Marche
- Standard: MIPAAF
- Use: dual-purpose: meat, also milk

Traits
- Weight: Male: 90 kg (200 lb); Female: 68 kg (150 lb)
- Height: Male: 82 cm (32 in); Female: 74 cm (29 in)
- Wool colour: white
- Face colour: white
- Horn status: hornless in both sexes

The Fabrianese is a modern Italian breed of domestic sheep from the Marche region of central Italy. It takes its name from the town and comune of Fabriano, in the province of Ancona. It was created as a dual-purpose breed in the 1960s by cross-breeding local breeds of the Apennines of the Marche with rams of the Bergamasca breed from the Alps of Lombardy. It is raised in the eastern foothills of the Apennines, in the provinces of Ancona, Ascoli Piceno and Macerata in the Marche, and in the province of Terni in Umbria.

== History ==
The Fabrianese was created as a dual-purpose breed in the 1960s by cross-breeding local breeds of the Apennines of the Marche with rams of the Bergamasca breed from the Alps of Lombardy. It takes its name from the town and comune of Fabriano, in the province of Ancona.

It is one of the seventeen autochthonous Italian sheep breeds for which a genealogical herdbook is kept by the Associazione Nazionale della Pastorizia, the Italian national association of sheep-breeders; the herdbook was established in 1974. In 1983 the breed population was in the region of 25000 head, of which some 4600 were registered. In 1997 the total number was about 70000. In 2013 the number registered for the breed was 3342. In 2024 its conservation status was listed in DAD-IS as 'at risk/endangered'.

== Characteristics ==
The Fabrianese is of medium size, with white wool. The face is white, the profile is markedly convex, and the ears are semi-lop. It is always polled.

== Use ==
The average age and weight of lambs at slaughter is unclear; the target is approximately 25 kg (55 lb) at 60 days.

The milk yield, including that taken by the lambs, averages 150 litres (40 US gal) in 180 days for primiparous, and 200 to 220 litres (~55 US gal) for pluriparous, ewes.
