= Varesina sheep =

Breed of sheep

Varesina
- Country of origin: Italy

Traits
- Weight: Male: 85–90 kg; Female: 70–75 kg
- Wool color: off-white
- Face color: white

Notes
- dual-purpose, meat and wool

The Varesina is a rare breed of domestic sheep from the province of Varese in Lombardy, in northern Italy. It originates from the area of Biandronno and Travedona; members of the breed have been identified in the comuni of Albizzate and Arcisate. The Varesina is closely related to the Bergamasca and the Biellese, but is smaller. It is one of the forty-two autochthonous local sheep breeds of limited distribution for which a herdbook is kept by the Associazione Nazionale della Pastorizia, the Italian national association of sheep-breeders.

In 1983 there were about 1000 Varesina sheep, of which 800 were registered. Recent estimates place total numbers at about 60. In 2013 no total number for the breed was recorded in the herdbook. The breed is at serious risk of extinction and is protected.
