= Vicentina sheep =

Breed of sheep

Vicentina
- Other names: Fodata; Foza
- Country of origin: Italy

Traits
- Weight: Female: 83 kg
- Wool color: mostly white
- Face color: white mottled with black

Notes
- dual-purpose, meat and wool

The Vicentina is a breed of domestic sheep from the province of Vicenza in the Veneto, in north-east Italy. The origins of the breed are not clear, but it descends from the sheep of the Cimbrian cultural area of the Sette Comuni of the Altopiano di Asiago. It may share common origins with the Lamon, with which it was also cross-bred in the years after the Second World War. The Vicentina is one of the forty-two autochthonous local sheep breeds of limited distribution for which a herdbook is kept by the Associazione Nazionale della Pastorizia, the Italian national association of sheep-breeders.

In 1598 there were 135,000 sheep on the Altipiano di Asiago, and in 1776 there were 200,000. In 1953 there were about 9200 Vicentina sheep; by 1991 the total had fallen to 61. In 2013 the total number for the breed as recorded in the herdbook was 115.
