= Zerasca =

Italian breed of sheep

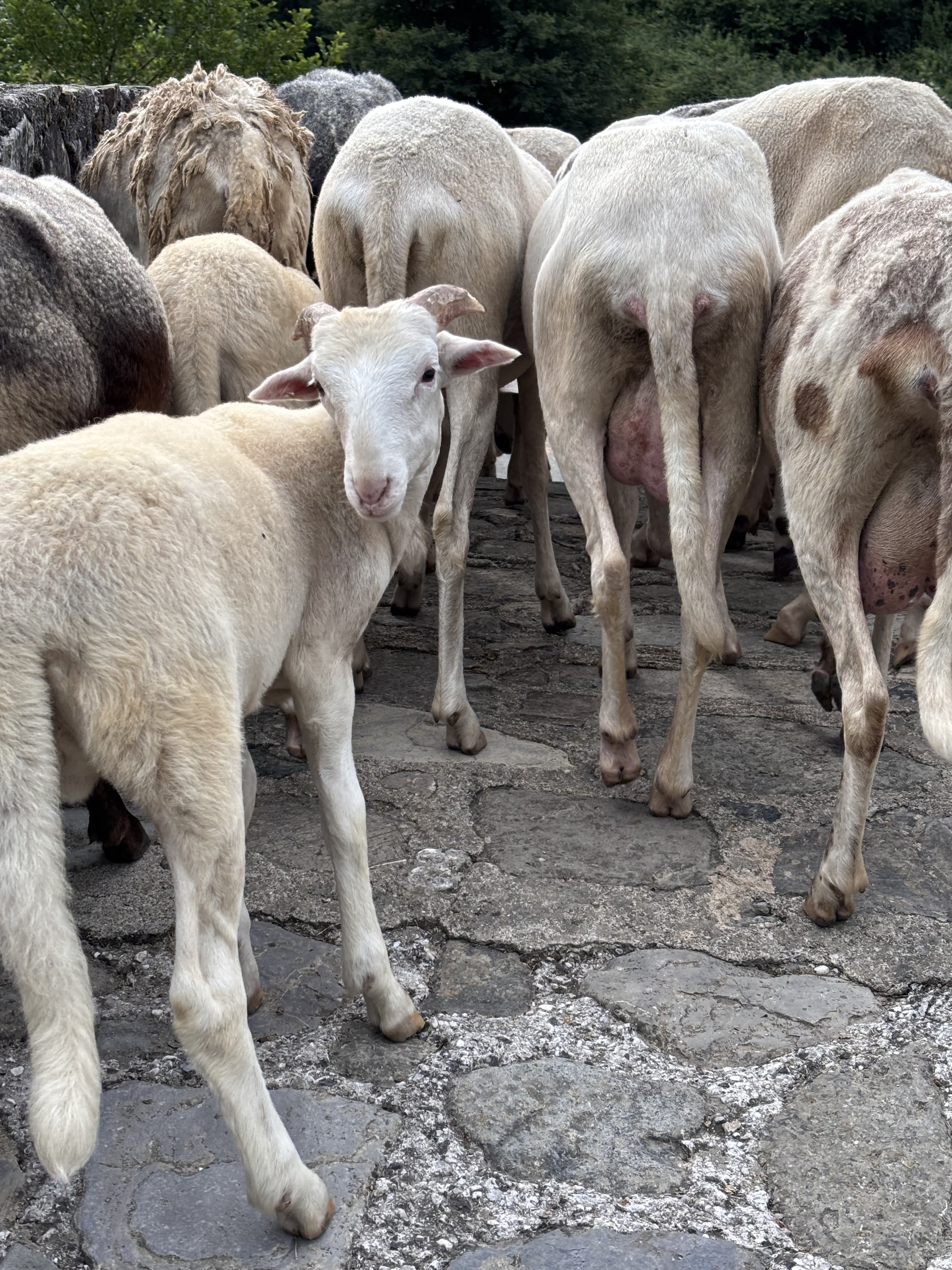
- Conservation status: FAO (2007): not at risk; DAD-IS (2025): at risk/endangered
- Country of origin: Italy
- Distribution: Province of Massa Carrara, in Tuscany
- Use: meat

Traits
- Weight: Female: 62 kg
- Height: Female: 75 cm
- Wool colour: white
- Face colour: white, sometimes mottled with brown or grey

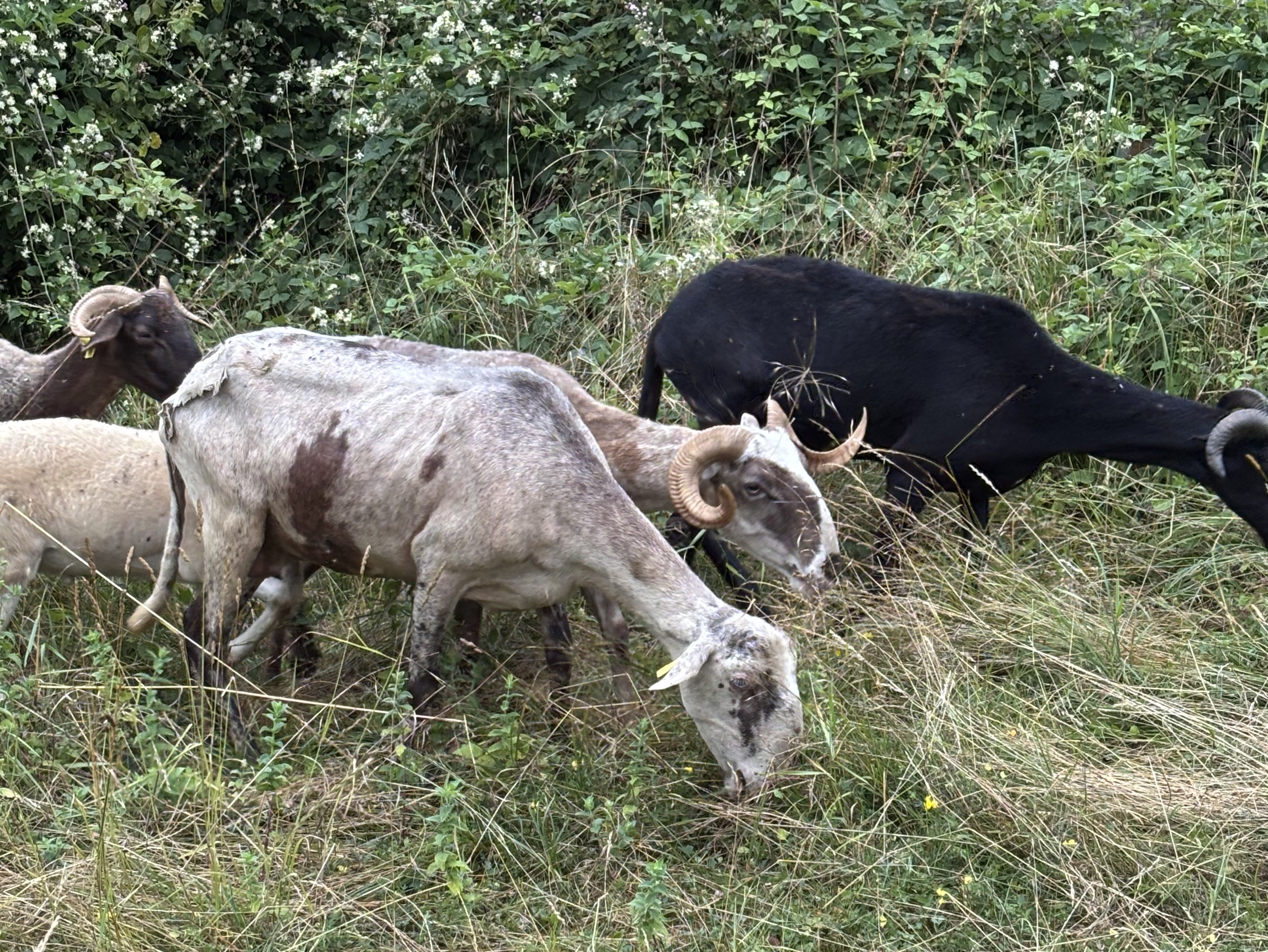

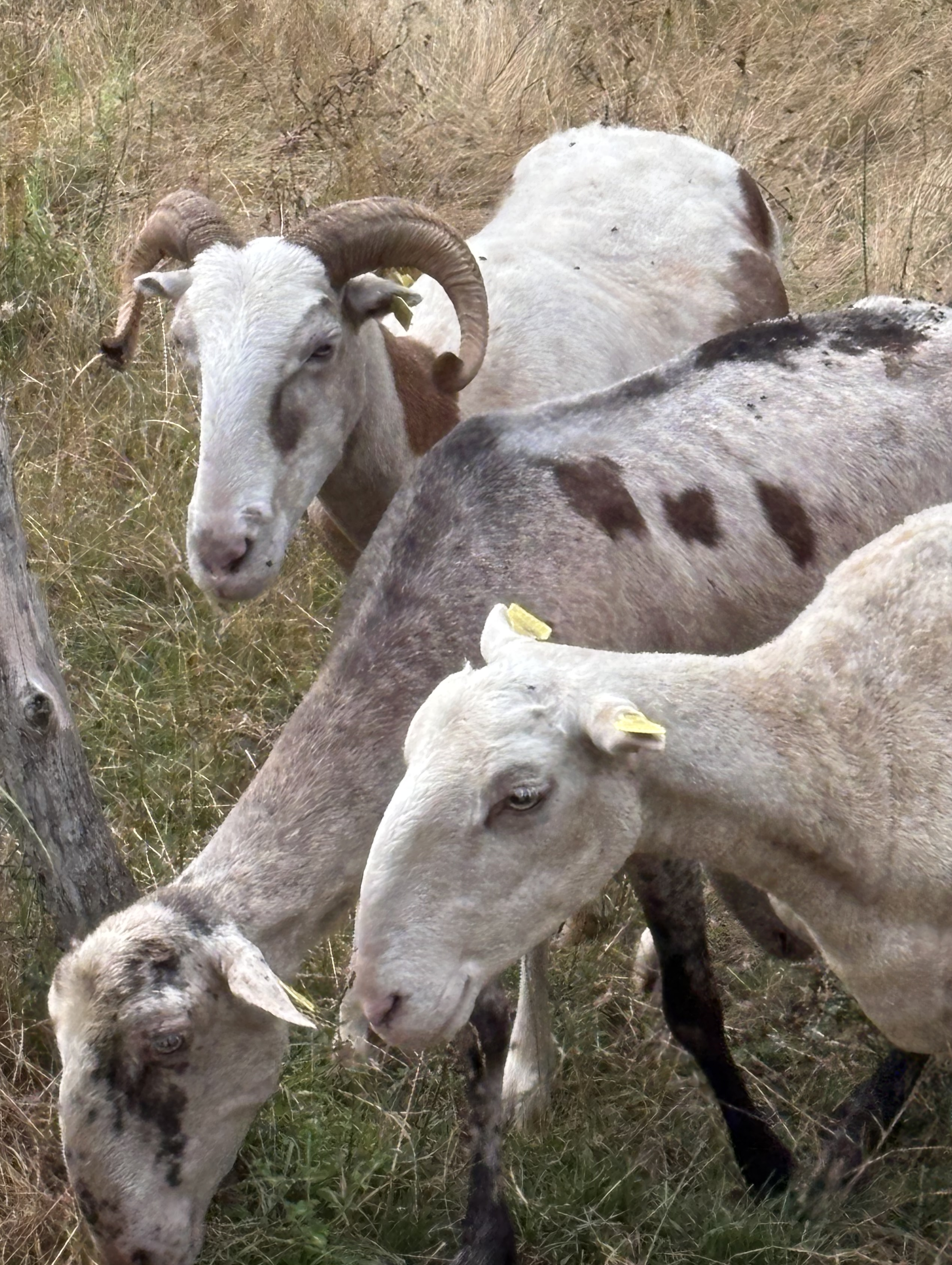

The Zerasca is an Italian breed of upland sheep from the province of Massa Carrara, in Tuscany in central Italy. It is raised almost exclusively in the comune of Zeri and the neighbouring comune of Pontremoli, and is one of the forty-two autochthonous local sheep breeds of limited distribution for which a flock-book is kept by the Associazione Nazionale della Pastorizia, the Italian national association of sheep-breeders.

It is reared only for lamb; lambs are milk-fed until they are slaughtered.

== History ==
The origins of the Zerasca are uncertain. It belongs to the Apennine group of breeds, and is the traditional sheep of the area of Zeri, in the upper Lunigiana, on the border between Tuscany and Emilia-Romagna. By the mid-nineteenth century this area had a reputation for producing lamb of good quality.

Because the area is not easily reached, the sheep remained largely isolated from other sheep populations until the mid-twentieth century. In the years after the Second World War, systematic use was made of Massese rams with the aim of improving milk yield; this resulted in heavier and faster-growing lambs, but also a reduction in resistance to disease and ability to forage on poor terrain, an increase in mammary defects, an increase in colour variability, and little improvement in milk yield. A later attempt at improvement by cross-breeding with Bergamasca stock resulted in a lower killing-out percentage (carcase yield) than in pure-bred stock.

A breed society, the Consorzio di valorizzazione e tutela della pecora e dell'agnello di Zeri, was formed in 2001, and a Slow Food Praesidium established at about the same time.

The Zerasca is one of the forty-two autochthonous local sheep breeds of limited distribution for which a flock-book is kept by the Associazione Nazionale della Pastorizia, the Italian national association of sheep-breeders. In 2013 the total number for the breed was 951. A total population of 380 head in 17 flocks was reported for 2023, including 315 breeding ewes and 30 active rams; in 2025 the conservation status of the breed was listed in DAD-IS as "at risk/endangered".

== Characteristics ==
The Zerasca is of medium size: on average, ewes stand about 75 cm at the shoulder and weigh some 62 kg. Rams are always horned; some ewes are polled. The fleece is mostly white, with spots or patches of reddish or grey colour on the legs and face; the face, lower legs and underbelly are bare of wool. The skin is unpigmented, but may have pigmented areas on the face and legs.

The sheep are rustic and well adapted to grazing on the mountain pastures where they are kept almost year-round, coming under shelter only in the harshest winter weather.

== Use ==
The Zerasca is reared only for the production of lamb. The milk of the ewes, which has an unusually high protein content, is reserved for the lambs, which are kept at pasture and milk-fed until ready for slaughter.
