= Biellese (disambiguation) =

Biellese, meaning of or relating to the town of Biella, may also refer to:

- The Biellese, the area of or Province of Biella
- The Biellese breed of sheep
- A.S.D. Junior Biellese Libertas, a football club in Biella
