= Tacola =

Tacola may refer to:

- Cloud Chief, Oklahoma, a small unincorporated community in Washita County, Oklahoma, United States
- Tacola (butterfly), a brush-footed butterfly genus in the Limenitidinae
- The Tacola sheep, a breed of Italian sheep

== See also ==
- Taccola, Mariano di Jacopo (1382 – c. 1453), Italian polymath
