= Sarda sheep =

Italian breed of sheep

Sarda
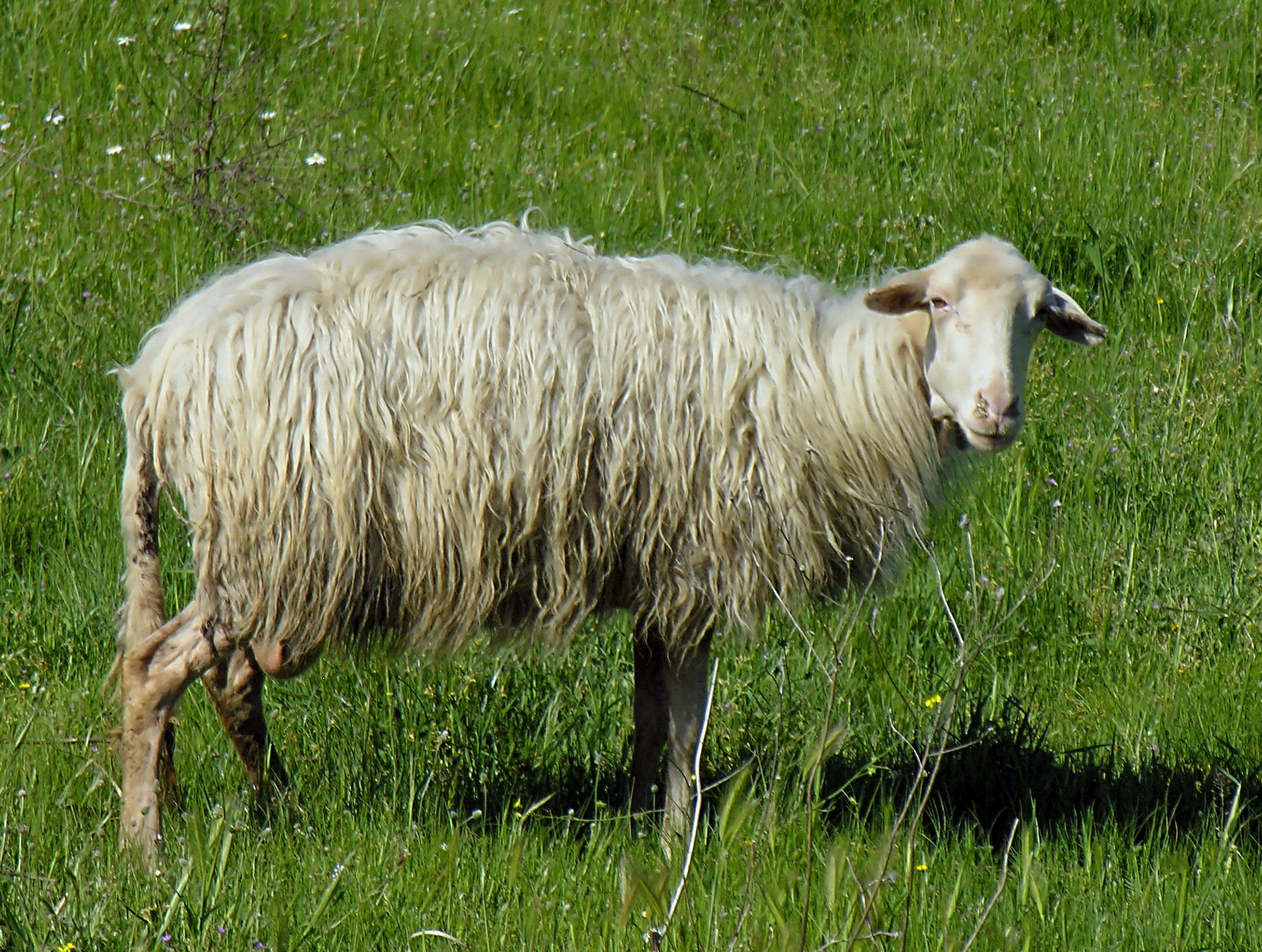
- Other names: Sardinian
- Country of origin: Italy
- Use: milk

Traits
- Weight: Male: 59 kg; Female: 42 kg
- Height: Male: 71 cm; Female: 63 cm
- Skin colour: unpigmented
- Wool colour: white
- Face colour: white
- Horn status: rudimentary or absent in rams, absent in ewes

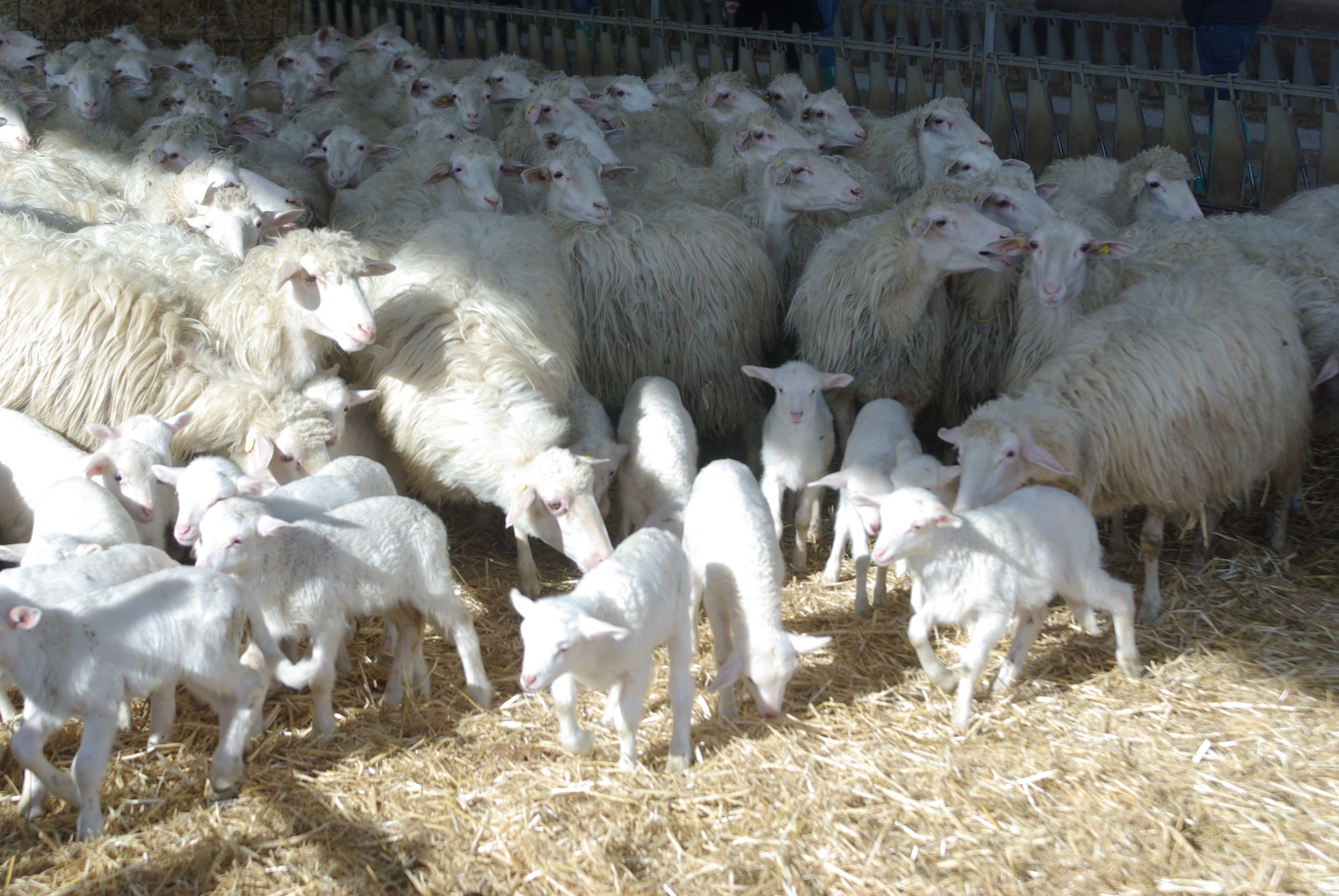
Ewes with lambs

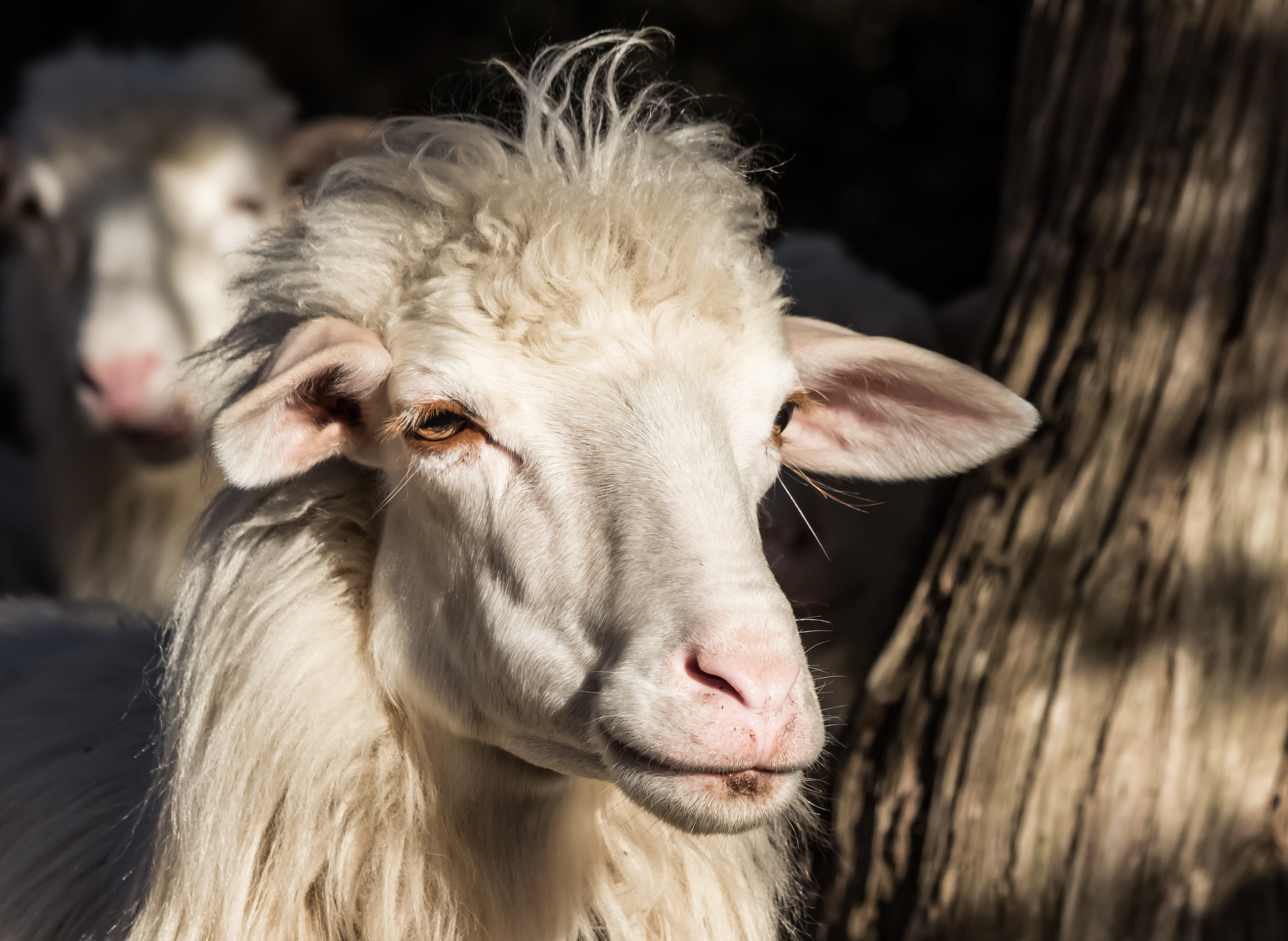
Ewe on the island of Caprera

The Sarda is an Italian breed of domestic sheep indigenous to the Mediterranean island of Sardinia. It is raised throughout the island, in some regions of mainland Italy, and in some other Mediterranean countries, particularly Tunisia.

It is both the most economically significant and the most numerous Italian breed of sheep. It is the principal breed for production of sheep's milk; most of the milk is used to make pecorino sardo cheese. The Sarda is highly adaptable; it may be kept on lowland or on mountainous terrains, and is suitable both for intensive and for extensive or transhumant management. The long, coarse white wool is of little value; it may be used to make carpets or mattresses.

== History ==
The Sarda is both the most economically significant and the most numerous Italian breed of sheep. It is a traditional breed of the Mediterranean island of Sardinia. It is reared throughout the island, and in substantial numbers in the mainland Italian regions of Lazio and Tuscany, where there are many Sardinian shepherds; there are small populations in Emilia-Romagna, in Liguria and in Molise. It is also present in other Mediterranean countries, particularly Tunisia, where it is known as the Sicilo-Sarde.

In the late nineteenth and early twentieth centuries a number of attempts were made to improve it by cross-breeding with stock of the Barbaresca, Gentile di Puglia, Merino, Rambouillet, Sopravissana and Vissana breeds among others. These experiments invariably had a negative impact on milk production. Recent selection has been aimed at improving the conformation of the udder and at making it more suitable for mechanised milking.

It is one of the seventeen autochthonous Italian sheep breeds for which a genealogical herdbook is kept by the Associazione Nazionale della Pastorizia, the Italian national association of sheep-breeders. The herdbook was established in 1928. Total numbers for the breed are estimated at 5000000; in 2013 the number recorded in the herdbook was 225207.

== Characteristics ==
The Sarda is of medium size: average heights and weights are 63 cm and 42 kg for ewes and 71 cm and 59 kg for rams. The fleece is white, as is the face; the face and lower legs are free of wool. The skin is fine and unpigmented; there may be some flecks of colour on the skin of the face or limbs. Ewes are naturally polled, rams may have vestigial or rudimentary horns.

The Sarda adapts well to a variety of terrains and environments: it may be kept on lowland or on mountainous terrains, and is suitable both for intensive and for extensive or transhumant management.

== Use ==
The Sarda is reared principally for its milk, most of which is used to make pecorino sardo or pecorino romano cheese, both of which have Denominazione di Origine Protetta status. The milk yield of pluriparous ewes is in the range 100–180 kg in a lactation of 180 days; the milk has an average fat content of 6% and contains about 5.3% protein.

The meat is most often sold as milk lamb, slaughtered at a weight of some 10 kg, which is reached in approximately 30 days.

The long, coarse white wool is of little value; it may be used to make carpets or mattresses. Ram fleeces weigh about 2.5 kg, those of ewes average 1.1 kg.
