= Varesina (disambiguation) =

Varesina, meaning from or relating to Varese, may refer to:

- The Carrozzeria Varesina, an Italian coachbuilder
- The Quartiere Varesina of Milan
- The Società Varesina per le Imprese Elettriche, a railway company
- The Varesina (sheep) breed of sheep
