= Pusterese =

Breed of sheep

- Other names: Pustera gigante; Nobile di Badia; Gadertaler
- Country of origin: Italy

Traits
- Weight: Male: 55–60 kg; Female: 50 kg
- Wool color: straw-white
- Face color: white

Notes
- dual-purpose, meat and wool

The Pusterese is a breed of domestic sheep from the autonomous province of Bolzano in northern Italy. It may also be called the Pustera gigante, Nobile di Badia or Gadertaler. It is raised mainly in the Val Pusteria (Pustertal), from which it takes its name, and in the Val Gardena; it has been reported also from the province of Belluno. The origins of the breed are unclear; it probably originates from the Tirol, but has also been influenced by the Lamon. It is one of the forty-two autochthonous local sheep breeds of limited distribution for which a herdbook is kept by the Associazione Nazionale della Pastorizia, the Italian national association of sheep-breeders.

In 2013 total numbers for the breed were not reported; in 1979 the total number was estimated at 50 head.
