= Estonian native cattle =

Breed of cattle

Estonian native cattle (Estonian: eesti maatõug) are a dairy cattle breed from Estonia. The colour varies from yellow-brown to red and most animals are naturally polled. The breed has mainly been improved from native stock, but some Jersey and Finnish bulls were used from 1955 to 1967 to overcome the effects of inbreeding. Organised breeding began in 1909 and a herdbook has been kept since 1914.
