= Cornigliese =

Italian breed of sheep

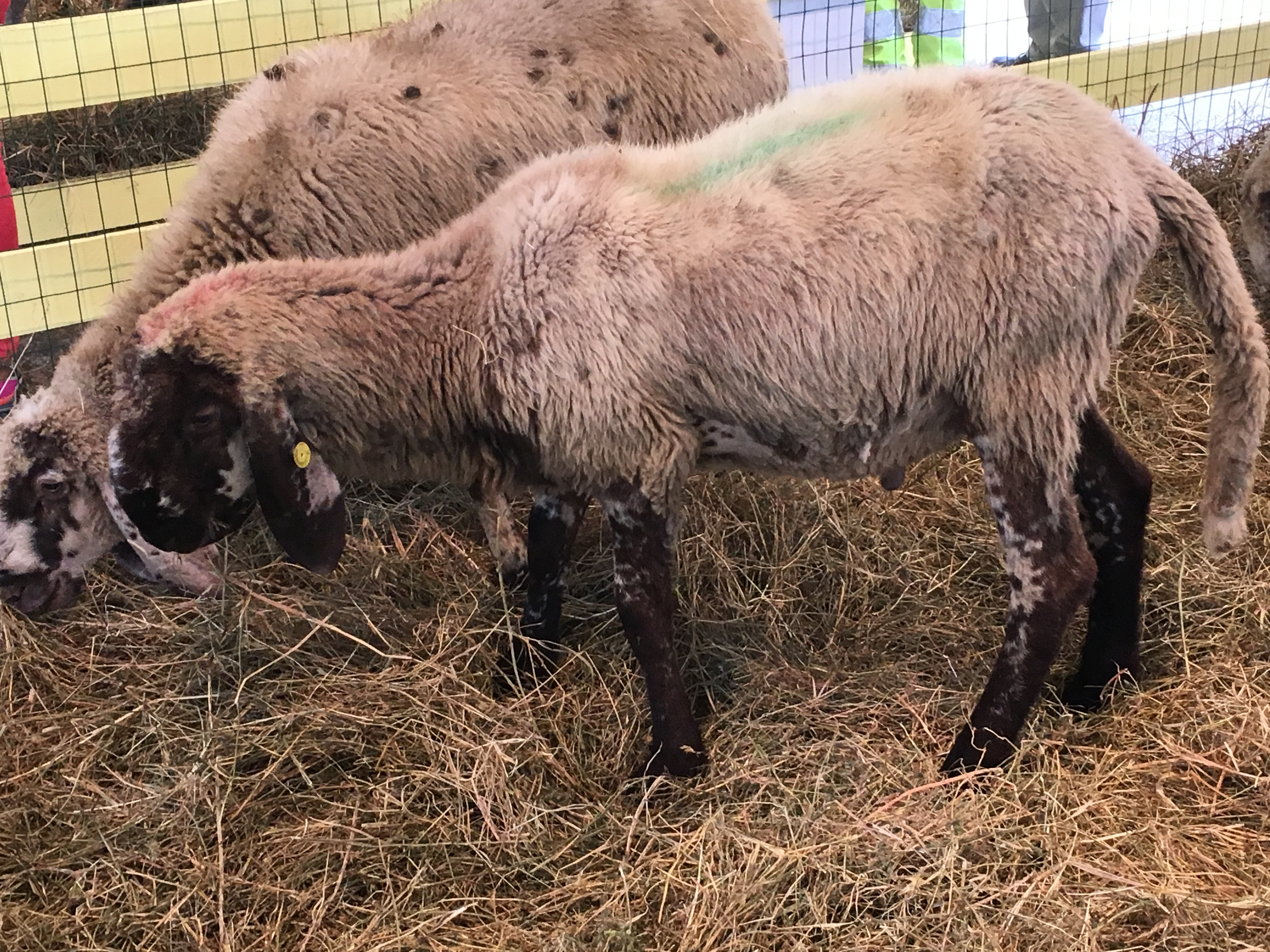
- Conservation status: FAO (2007): endangered; DAD-IS (2025): at risk/endangered
- Other names: Corniglio; Borgotarese; Mucca di Corniglio
- Country of origin: Italy
- Distribution: Emilia–Romagna
- Standard: MIPAAF
- Use: triple-purpose, milk, meat and wool

Traits
- Weight: Male: 100 kg; Female: 75 kg
- Height: Male: 85 cm; Female: 75 cm
- Wool colour: white, sometimes spotted
- Face colour: spotted or mottled

The Cornigliese or Corniglio is an Italian breed of domestic sheep from the Apennines of the province of Parma, in Emilia–Romagna in central Italy. It takes its name from the mountain town of Corniglio in that province; it may also be called Borgotarese after the town of Borgo Val di Taro which is about 40 km to the west. It is raised in the provinces of Bologna, Ferrara, Modena, Parma, Ravenna and Reggio Emilia.

== History ==
The Cornigliese breed was created in the mid-eighteenth century by the Borboni of Parma by crossing the local Vissana breed with Spanish merinos to improve the quality of the wool, at that time the most important attribute of sheep. In the early twentieth century, the weight was increased by intromission of Bergamasca blood. The Cornigliese is one of the forty-two autochthonous local sheep breeds of limited distribution for which a herd-book is kept by the Associazione Nazionale della Pastorizia, the Italian national association of sheep-breeders.

The conservation status of the Cornigliese was listed as "endangered" by the Food and Agriculture Organization of the United Nations in 2007. Between 2000 and 2014 total numbers recorded for the breed fell steadily from 2179 to 1369.
