= Nera di Arbus =

Italian breed of sheep

- Conservation status: FAO (2007): not listed; DAD-IS (2025): not at risk
- Other names: Pecora Nera di Arbus
- Country of origin: Italy
- Distribution: Sardinia
- Use: dual-purpose, primarily for milk

Traits
- Weight: Male: 46 kg; Female: 35 kg
- Height: Male: 65 cm; Female: 58 cm
- Wool colour: black
- Face colour: black
- Horn status: horned

Notes
- ear-lobes small or absent

The Nera di Arbus, more fully Pecora Nera di Arbus ('black sheep of Arbus'), is an Italian breed of small domestic sheep indigenous to the Mediterranean island of Sardinia, off the western coast of central Italy. It is closely similar to the widespread Sarda breed of Sardinia, but is completely black. It takes its name from the comune of Arbus, in the province of Medio Campidano, in the south-western part of the island. It is raised in the provinces of Cagliari, Nuoro, Oristano and Sassari. The breed achieved official recognition in 2008.

== History ==
The Nera di Arbus is one of the seventeen autochthonous Italian sheep breeds for which a genealogical herd-book is kept by the Associazione Nazionale della Pastorizia, the Italian national association of sheep-breeders. In 2008, the first year of registration, 233 head were registered in the herd-book; in 2013 the total number recorded was 4118; for 2023 a total of 8389 head was reported, including 7403 breeding ewes and 313 active rams. In 2025 the conservation status of the breed was listed as "not at risk".

== Characteristics ==
The Nera di Arbus is closely similar to the widespread Sarda breed of Sardinia, but is completely black. The fleece is black, covering the whole body except for the face and lower legs; the skin is elastic, fine and black, sometimes with pale flecks in those areas that are free of wool. Average body weights are 35 kg for ewes and 46 kg for rams; average heights at the shoulder are 58 cm and 65 cm respectively.

== Use ==
The milk yield of the Nera di Arbus, over and above that taken by the lambs, averages 50 litres in 100 days for primiparous ewes, and 88–98 litres in 180 days for pluriparous ones. The milk averages 6.5% milk-fat and 5.6% milk protein. Lambs weigh 9.5–9.8 kg at 30 days. Rams yield about 2 kg of wool, ewes about 1.2 kg; the wool is of coarse quality. It is used to make orbace, a coarse hand-woven cloth, from which two traditional Sardinian garments are made: sa mastrucca, the overcoat worn by shepherds; and su sacu, a heavy waterproof blanket.
