= Massese =

Massese may refer to:

- Any person, thing or concept from or related to Massa, a town in Tuscany, Italy
- Massese (sheep), a breed of sheep from the Alpi Apuane of the province of Massa Carrara, Italy
- U.S. Massese 1919, a football club in Massa, Tuscany, Italy
