= Garfagnina Bianca =

Italian breed of sheep

- Conservation status: FAO (2007): critical-maintained; DAD-IS (2025): at risk/endangered
- Country of origin: Italy
- Distribution: Garfagnana, Tuscany
- Standard: MIPAAF
- Use: dual-purpose, milk and meat

Traits
- Weight: Male: 50–55 kg; Female: 40–45 kg
- Height: Male: 65–70 cm; Female: 60–65 cm
- Wool colour: white
- Face colour: white
- Horn status: horned in both sexes

The Garfagnina Bianca is an Italian breed of small domestic sheep from the historic area of the Garfagnana, the mountainous northern part of the province of Lucca, in Tuscany in central Italy. It shares common origins with the other sheep breeds of the Tosco-Emilian Apennines – the Cornella Bianca, the Massese and the Zerasca. It is one of the forty-two autochthonous local sheep breeds of limited distribution for which a herd-book is kept by the Associazione Nazionale della Pastorizia, the Italian national association of sheep-breeders.

Breed numbers declined drastically in the second half of the twentieth century. In 1961 there were more than 50000, distributed over much of central Italy; a census in 1983 identified fewer than 50 pure-bred specimens. In 2013 total numbers for the breed were 356.
