= Matesina =

Sheep breed

- Country of origin: Italy
- Use: triple-purpose: meat, milk and wool

Traits
- Weight: Male: 70 kg; Female: 60 kg
- Wool colour: off-white or pale hazelnut
- Face colour: white

The Matesina is an Italian breed of domestic sheep. It is raised on the massif of the Matese and in the Valle Telesina, in Campania in southern Italy. It originates from the area of Dragoni, in the province of Caserta, and apparently derives from cross-breeding between the Appenninica and Gentile di Puglia breeds; the wool, like that of the Gentile di Puglia, is of fine quality. The Matesina is one of the forty-two autochthonous local sheep breeds of limited distribution for which a herdbook is kept by the Associazione Nazionale della Pastorizia, the Italian national association of sheep-breeders.

In 2013 total numbers for the breed were not reported. 1000 head were counted in 1983; total numbers were reported as 120 in 2003 and estimated at 100 in 2007.
