= Turchessa =

Breed of sheep

- Conservation status: FAO (2007): critical; DAD-IS (2025): at risk/endangered
- Other names: Turchesca; Pecora di Poggiomarino
- Country of origin: Italy
- Distribution: province of Benevento; province of Avellino
- Use: mainly for milk

Traits
- Weight: Male: 60–65 kg; Female: 45–50 kg
- Height: Male: 70–75 cm; Female: 55–60 cm
- Wool color: white
- Face color: white, sometimes with dark markings
- Horn status: spiral horns usually present in males

The Turchessa or Turchesca is a rare Italian breed of domestic sheep. It originated on the foothills of Vesuvius, in Campania in southern Italy. It may also be known as the Pecora di Poggiomarino, for the comune of Poggiomarino in that area. Its conservation status is not clear.

== History ==
The origins of the Turchessa are unknown. It apparently originated in the foothills of Vesuvius, in Campania in southern Italy, in the area of Sarno in the province of Salerno and Avella in the province of Avellino, but is now distributed mainly in the provinces of Avellino and Benevento. Like the Laticauda, distributed in the approximately the same area, and the Barbaresca breed of Sicily, it appears to result from the hybridisation of local breeds with Barbary (or Barbarin) sheep of Maghrebi origin. These may have been brought to the area by the Bourbon king Charles VII of Naples.

It has been suggested that the Turchessa is a synonym of the Laticauda, which, however, is a broad-tailed breed.

The Turchessa is one of the forty-four autochthonous local sheep breeds of limited distribution officially recognised by the Ministero delle Politiche Agricole Alimentari e Forestali, the Italian ministry of agriculture. A herd-book is kept by the Associazione Nazionale della Pastorizia, the Italian national association of sheep-breeders.

In 2007 the total number for the breed was reported as 4; in the same year the FAO classified its conservation status as "critical". Further research into numbers and distribution is needed. A small number are kept by the Consorzio per la Sperimentazione, Divulgazione e Applicazione di Biotecniche Innovative of Benevento.

== Characteristics ==
The Turchessa is hardy, frugal, and well adapted to the poor pasture of its mountain environment. It is white, often with dark markings to the face and lower legs. The coat is thin and open. The hooves are strong, and are often black. Males are usually horned; the horns are spiralled.

== Use ==
The Turchessa is kept mainly for milk production.
