= Tiroler Steinschaf =

Austrian breed of sheep

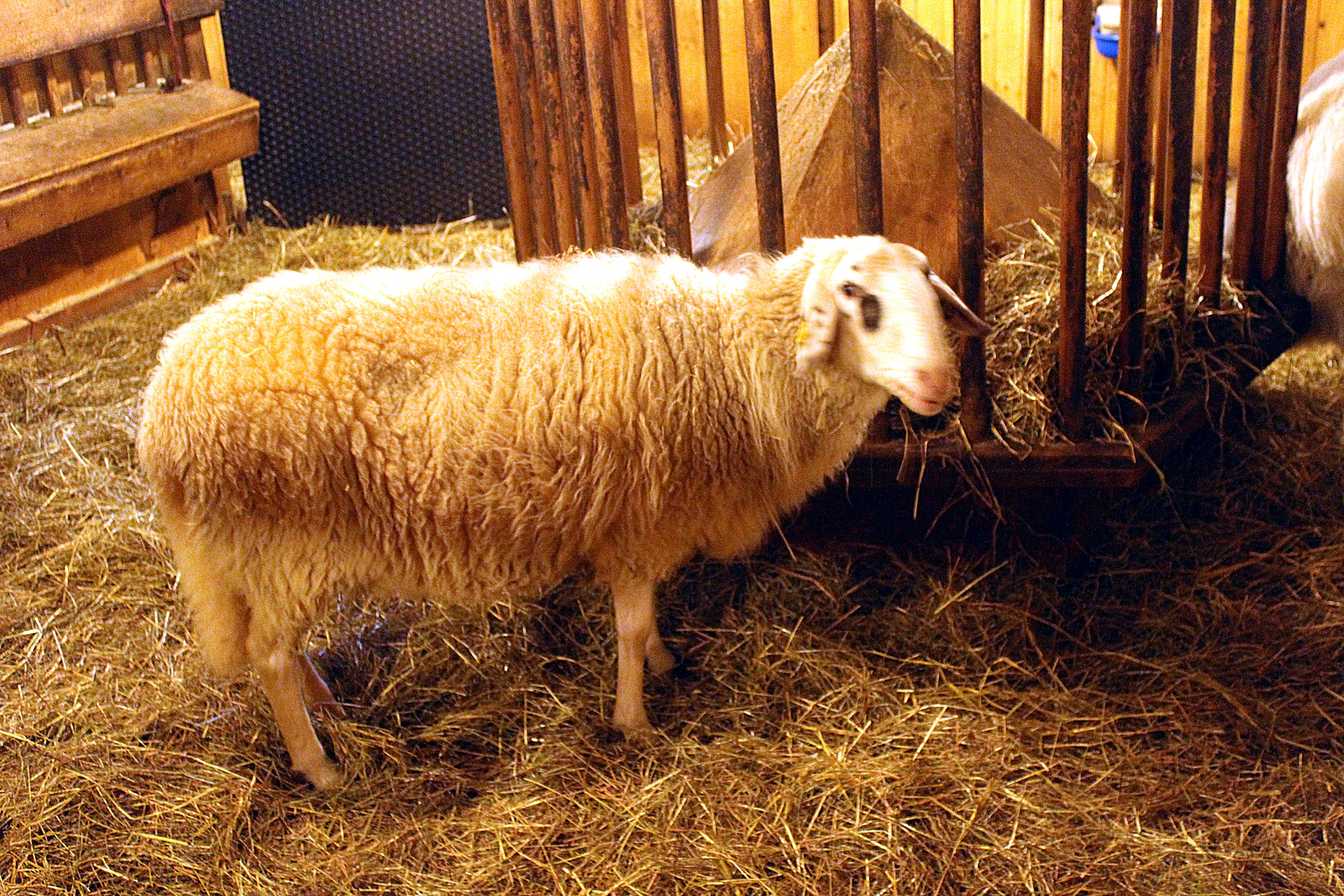
- In the Tiergarten Schönbrunn, Vienna
- Other names: Pecora della Roccia Tirolese
- Country of origin: Austria

Traits
- Weight: Male: 90 kg; Female: 70 kg
- Wool colour: grey, black or white
- Face colour: usually black

Notes
- dual-purpose, meat and wool

The Tiroler Steinschaf or Pecora della Roccia Tirolese is a breed of domestic sheep from the mountainous Tyrol area of Austria; a few are raised in Italy. The name means "Tyrolean rock sheep". It is raised in the states of Tyrol and Salzburg in Austria and in the autonomous province of Bolzano in Italy. It dates from the early 19th century and is the oldest Tyrolean sheep breed.

The Austrian herdbook was established in 1973. The registered population reported for Austria in 2012 was 2780 to 3500, and total numbers are estimated at 12,000.

The Tiroler Steinschaf is one of the forty-two autochthonous local sheep breeds of limited distribution for which a herdbook is kept by the Associazione Nazionale della Pastorizia, the Italian national association of sheep-breeders. In 2013 no total number for the breed was recorded in the herdbook; total numbers are about 60 head.
