= Noticiana =

Breed of sheep

- Conservation status: FAO (2007): no data; DAD-IS (2025): at risk/endangered
- Country of origin: Italy
- Distribution: south-eastern Sicily
- Use: dual-purpose, primarily for milk

Traits
- Weight: Male: 85 kg; Female: 55 kg
- Height: Male: 85 cm; Female: 75 cm
- Wool colour: white
- Face colour: brick-red
- Horn status: usually hornless

Notes
- lop-eared

The Noticiana is an Italian breed of domestic sheep indigenous to the inland parts of the province of Syracuse, in the south-eastern part of the Mediterranean island of Sicily, in southern Italy. Its name derives from that of the town and comune of Noto. It is raised in the province of Syracuse and in neighbouring parts of that of Ragusa. It is a southern Mediterranean breed, and derives from the Comisana.

The Noticiana is one of the forty-two autochthonous local sheep breeds of limited distribution for which a herd-book is kept by the Associazione Nazionale della Pastorizia, the Italian national association of sheep-breeders. However the herd-book is apparently empty and none have been reported for many years. The numbers and conservation status of the breed are unknown.

The milk yield of the Noticiana averages 35 litres in 100 days for primiparous ewes, and 80 litres in 200 days for pluriparous ones. The milk is used to make the regional cheeses of the Val di Noto area, fresh and peppered pecorino, and ricotta.
