= Scur =

Animal horn growth

A scur is an incompletely developed horn growth. In cattle, scurs are not attached to the skull, whereas horns are attached and have blood vessels and nerves. Scurs may also occur in sheep and goats.

== Genetic inheritance ==
The gene for scurs is inherited separately from the polled gene in cattle. Not all polled animals lack the scur gene. Since horned is recessive to polled, no horned cattle carry the polled allele, but they may also carry scurs.

In cattle, genetic expression of the scur gene is different from that of the dominant polled gene, in that the scur gene's expression depends on the sex of the animal. The scur gene is dominant in males and recessive in females.

== See also ==
- Horn (anatomy)
- Polled livestock
- Livestock dehorning
