= Cornella Bianca =

Breed of sheep

- Conservation status: FAO (2007): critical
- Country of origin: Italy
- Distribution: province of Bologna; province of Ferrara; province of Modena; province of Reggio Emilia
- Standard: MIPAAF
- Use: dual-purpose, milk and meat

Traits
- Weight: Male: 80–85 kg; Female: 65–70 kg
- Height: Male: 85–90 cm; Female: 75–80 cm
- Wool colour: white
- Face colour: white
- Horn status: horned in both sexes

The Cornella Bianca is an Italian breed of domestic sheep from the Apennines of Emilia–Romagna in central Italy. It is raised principally in mountainous parts of the provinces of Bologna, Modena and Reggio Emilia, where it is transhumant. Some are also raised in the plains around Ferrara, Rovigo and Vicenza. It is found particularly in the comuni of Minerbio, Baricella and Malalbergo in the province of Bologna and Argenta in the province of Ferrara.

== History ==
The origins of the Cornella Bianca breed are unknown. It has probably been influenced by the Garfagnina Bianca and Massese breeds from the Tuscan side of the Apennines, with which the transhumance would have brought it into contact. It is one of the forty-two autochthonous local sheep breeds of limited distribution for which a herdbook is kept by the Associazione Nazionale della Pastorizia, the Italian national association of sheep-breeders.

The conservation status of the Cornella Bianca was listed as "critical" by the Food and Agriculture Organization of the United Nations in 2007. In 2013 total numbers for the breed were reported to be 228.
