= Istriana goat =

Breed of goat

Istriana
- Conservation status: FAO (2007): critical
- Country of origin: Italy
- Distribution: Province of Gorizia
- Standard: MIPAAF
- Use: meat, milk

Traits
- Weight: Male: 55 kg; Female: 50 kg
- Height: Male: 65 cm; Female: 60 cm
- Coat: white
- Beard: usually bearded

Notes
- ears are pointed and erect; crop-eared mutations are seen
- Goat; Capra aegagrus hircus

The Istriana is an endangered breed of domestic goat indigenous to Istria and the Karst regions of the northern Adriatic, from north-east Italy to Croatia and Slovenia. A population of about 100 head was documented in the Italian province of Gorizia in the 1980s; there is no more recent data. In Croatia, where raising any goat not of the Swiss Saanen breed was illegal in the 1940s and 1950s, it has largely disappeared; a study is under way to establish whether it may be recoverable.

In Italy the Istriana is one of the forty-three autochthonous goat breeds of limited distribution for which a herdbook is kept by the Associazione Nazionale della Pastorizia, the Italian national association of sheep- and goat-breeders. No numbers have been recorded in the herd-book for many years; however, a population of 80 was reported to DAD-IS in 2005. Its conservation status in Italy was listed as "critical" by the Food and Agriculture Organization of the United Nations in 2007.
