= Rambouillet (French sheep breed) =

French breed of sheep

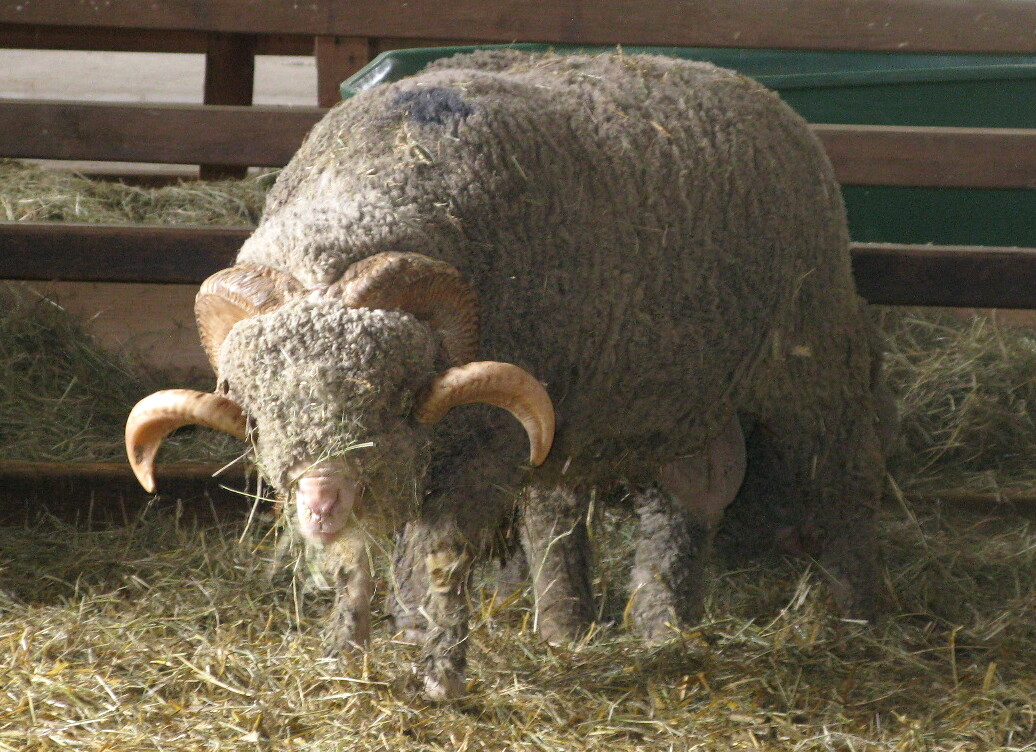
- A ram

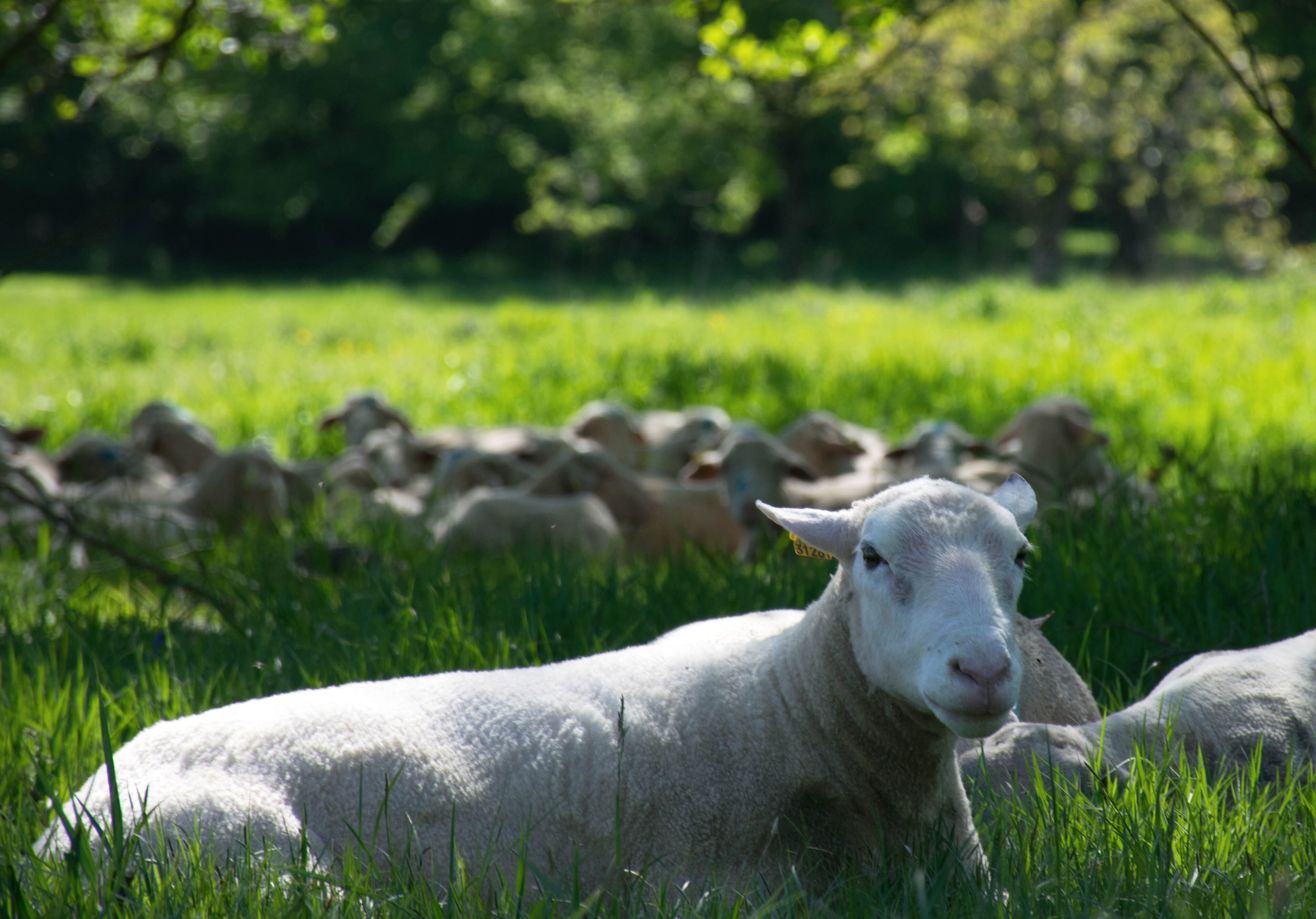
- In the park of the Château de Rambouillet
- Conservation status: FAO (2007): not at risk; DAD-IS (2026): at risk/endangered
- Other names: Mérinos de Rambouillet
- Country of origin: France
- Use: wool

Traits
- Weight: Male: average 80 kg; Female: average 50 kg
- Height: Male: average 72 cm; Female: average 62 cm
- Wool colour: white
- Face colour: white
- Horn status: rams horned or polled, ewes always polled

The Rambouillet or Mérinos de Rambouillet is a historic French breed of Merino sheep. It derives mainly from sheep of a variety of strains of Spanish Merino brought to France from the Province of Segovia in 1786. The only flock is kept at the Bergerie Nationale de Rambouillet in the commune of Rambouillet, in the département of Yvelines, to the south-west of Paris in the region of Île-de-France.

== History ==
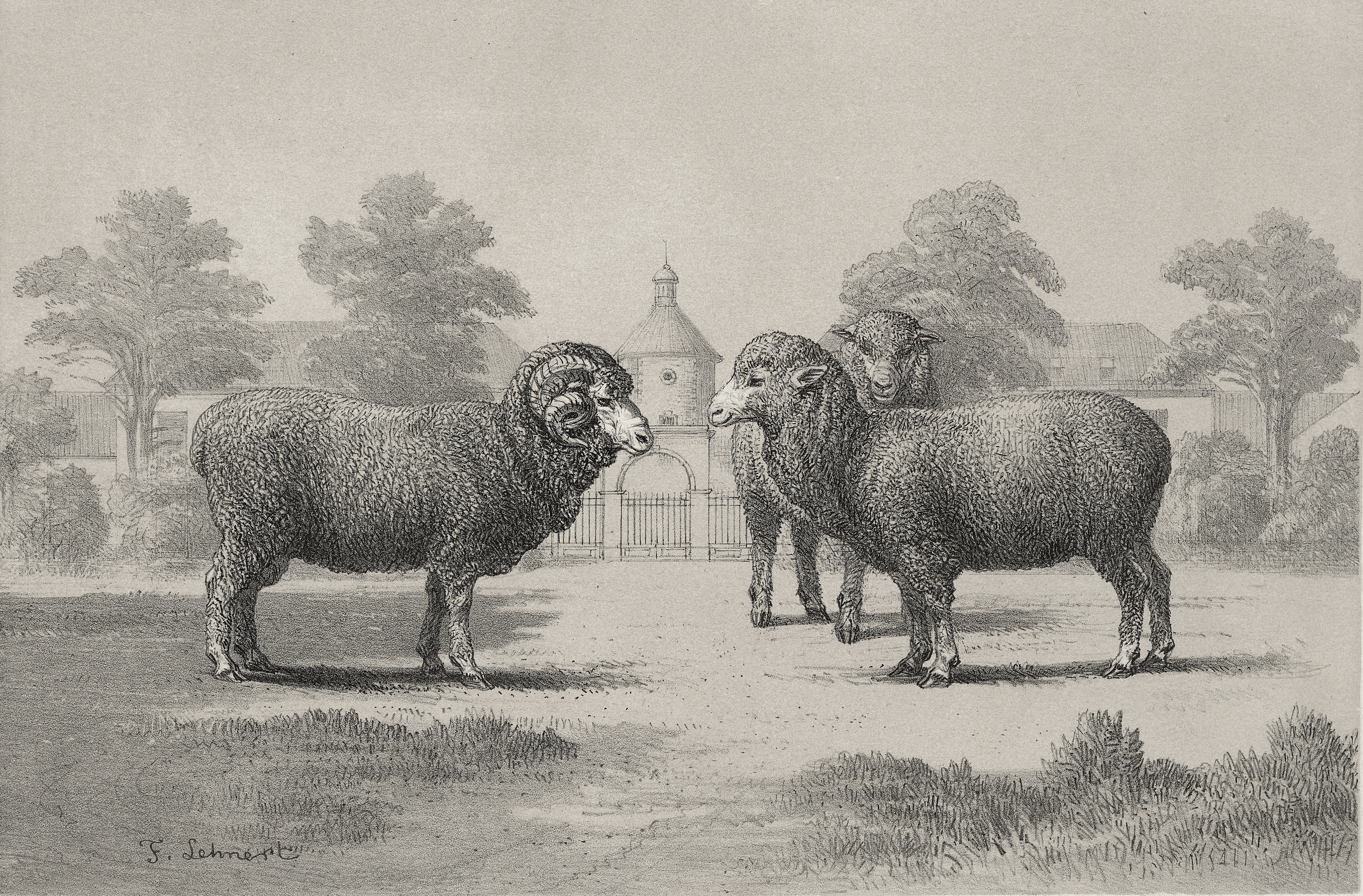
Ram and ewe in front of the Bergerie, engraving by Pierre-Frédéric Lehnert after a painting by Charles-François Marchal

The Rambouillet derives mainly from a shipment of 384 sheep – 334 ewes, 42 rams and 7 wethers – of a variety of strains of Spanish Merino brought from the Province of Segovia to France in 1786, in response to a request by Louis XVI to Carlos III of Spain, his cousin; 16 ewes and 2 rams died on the journey, the remaining 367 head survived. A further 40 animals were imported in 1801, but these had little influence on the development of the breed as the stock was of much lower quality than the first shipment. The flock was initially kept on the model farm – managed by Louis Jean-Marie Daubenton – established by Louis on the estate of 24000 ha he had bought in 1783 together with the Château de Rambouillet from his cousin Louis Jean Marie de Bourbon, duc de Penthièvre.

In 2005 the Bergerie Nationale ran into financial difficulties; various measures were taken to ensure the survival of the flock, including the deposit of frozen embryos in the Cryobanque Nationale.

Many breeds derive from, or have been influenced by the Rambouillet, among them the Mérinos Précoce of France, the Sopravissana of Italy, the Stavropol Merino of the former Soviet Union, the Karacabey Merino of Turkey, the American Rambouillet of the United States and the Dubrovnik of former Yugoslavia. Between about 1850 and 1930 it spread throughout France and was exported to many parts of the world, particularly in the southern hemisphere. Large numbers went to Australia, to New Zealand, to South Africa and to South American countries, while others were sent to Eastern Europe and to North Africa.

== Characteristics ==
It is a fine-wool breed, among the finest of all breeds. The fleece is thick and white, and covers the entire body, the legs down to the hooves, and most of the head, almost to the muzzle; it may constitute some 8% to 10% of the total body weight. Rams may be either horned – with coiled horns close to the head – or polled; ewes are always polled. The ears are short and are held horizontally.

It is large and strongly built: ewes normally weigh between 45 and 60 kg and stand from 45 to 60 cm at the withers, while rams usually weigh from 75 to 100 kg and stand between 75 and 90 cm tall.

== Use ==
The Rambouillet is conserved as a historic cultural and genetic resource and for the production of wool. It is not used for the production of meat.
