= Tacola sheep =

Breed of sheep

Tacola
- Country of origin: Italy

Traits
- Weight: Male: 95 kg; Female: 80 kg
- Wool color: white
- Face color: white

Notes
- meat

The Tacola is a breed of domestic sheep from the mountains of Piemonte in north-west Italy. It is raised in the provinces of Biella, Cuneo and Turin, particularly in the area of Biella and the Valsesia. It apparently derives from the Biellese, from which it is distinguished by its short ears. It is one of the forty-two autochthonous local sheep breeds of limited distribution for which a herdbook is kept by the Associazione Nazionale della Pastorizia, the Italian national association of sheep-breeders.

In 1983 the population was estimated at 100 head, and in 2000 it was 1,950. In 2013 the total number for the breed was 5,350.
