= Savoiarda =

Breed of sheep

- Other names: razza di Cuorgné; Cuorgné
- Country of origin: Italy
- Distribution: Val Chisone; Valli di Lanzo; Val Pellice; Val di Susa
- Standard: MIPAAF

Traits
- Weight: Male: 65–70 kg; Female: 55–60 kg
- Height: Male: 68–82 cm; Female: 67–75 cm
- Wool color: off-white
- Face color: white, black tip to nose, black "spectacles"

Notes
- triple-purpose, meat, milk and wool

The Savoiarda or razza di Cuorgné is a threatened breed of upland sheep from the province of Turin, in Piemonte, north-west Italy. The few remaining breeders are in the Val Chisone, the Val di Susa, the Valli di Lanzo and the Val Pellice.

== History ==
The origins of the Savoiarda are not clear; it appears to be related to the Thônes et Marthod breed from the area of Savoie, in France, which lies to the west of Piemonte. Out-crossing to other breeds including the Biellese and the Frabosana have reduced the productivity of the Savoiarda, caused a loss of morphological characteristics, and contributed to its decline. It is also threatened by the industrialisation of the lower Val di Susa. It is one of the forty-two autochthonous local sheep breeds of limited distribution for which a herdbook is kept by the Associazione Nazionale della Pastorizia, the Italian national association of sheep-breeders.

In 2013 the total number for the breed was 120.

== Characteristics ==
The Savoiarda is of medium size. Weight is variable, but averages 65–70 kg for rams and 55–60 kg for ewes. Rams usually stand 68–82 cm at the withers, and ewes about 67–72 cm. The head is rather large, with a convex profile. Rams are usually horned, with robust spiral horns; in ewes the horns are small or absent. The ears are narrow and slightly drooping. The face is white with black "spectacles" round the eyes; the muzzle is black, sometimes with white patches, and the legs are white with some black spotting. The coat is off-white.

== Use ==
The Savoiarda was traditionally a triple-purpose breed, raised for meat, milk and wool. It is now reared mainly for meat. Lambs are slaughtered at a weight of 12–15 kg.

Ewes give 100–150 litres of milk per lactation, most of which goes to the lambs. Rams yield about 3 kg of wool per year, and ewes about 2 kg. The wool is coarse, suitable for making mattresses, with a staple length of about 125–150 mm (5–6 in).
