= Alpagota =

Breed of sheep

- Conservation status: FAO (2007): not at risk
- Other names: Bellunese
- Country of origin: Italy
- Distribution: Province of Belluno; Neighbouring provinces
- Standard: MIPAAF
- Use: Triple-purpose, principally for meat

Traits
- Weight: Male: 52 kg; Female: 42 kg
- Height: Male: 67 cm; Female: 57 cm
- Skin color: Pink
- Wool color: White
- Face color: White with brown or black mottling
- Horn status: Both sexes are polled (hornless)

The Alpagota is a breed of sheep from the province of Belluno in the Veneto, in north-eastern Italy. It is particularly associated with the historic region of the Alpago, from which it takes its name, and is raised principally in that area.

== History ==
The origins of the Alpagota are unknown. It is raised principally in the historic region of the Alpago, which coincides with the area of the modern comuni of Chies d'Alpago, Farra d'Alpago, Pieve d'Alpago, Puos d'Alpago and Tambre in the south-east of the province of Belluno; some are raised in the neighbouring provinces of Padova, Pordenone and Treviso. The Alpagota probably shares a common origin with the Lamon breed from the Feltrino, the area around Feltre, some 50 km west of the Alpago. It is one of the forty-two autochthonous local sheep breeds of limited distribution for which a herdbook is kept by the Associazione Nazionale della Pastorizia, the Italian national association of sheep-breeders.

Of the twelve local sheep breeds present in the Veneto fifty years ago, only four survive. The Alpagota was identified by the European Community as a local breed at risk in the early 1990s, and in 1998 received PAT status under the name "Pecora Alpagota".

In 1960 there were over ten thousand of these sheep; by the year 2000 this had dwindled to about 1600.. By 2010 there were over 2400, and in 2013 the total numbers for the breed were reported as 3363.

== Characteristics ==
The Alpagota is a small to medium-sized breed with a white face with black markings, no horns and relatively small ears.

== Use ==
In the past the Alpagota was a triple-purpose breed, reared for meat, milk and wool; it is now kept mainly for meat production. A twentieth century problem farmers faced was the poor conformation of the carcasses and the short time (about one month around Easter) for which a good price was obtainable. In 2002, farmers in the area formed a co-operative and registered a trademark, creating a logo, "Agnello d'Alpago". To take part, the sheep had to be reared in the five municipalities of Alpago and conform to various methods of production criteria. The lambs were to be slaughtered at sixty to eighty days with a live weight of 22 to 35 kilograms (50 to 80 lb). The Slow Food organisation supported the project and helped promote the breed, marketing the meat and providing information to consumers. The campaign has been a success, with sales spread throughout much of the year, greater awareness of the product and better prices for farmers.
