= Sciara sheep =

Breed of sheep

Sciara
- Conservation status: unknown
- Other names: Moscia Calabrese
- Country of origin: Italy

Traits
- Weight: Male: 60–65 kg; Female: 45–50 kg
- Wool color: white
- Face color: white

Notes
- milk

The Sciara or Moscia Calabrese is an indigenous breed of domestic sheep from the provinces of Catanzaro and Cosenza, in Calabria in southern Italy. It is a hardy and frugal breed, well adapted to the poor and stony upland terrain of the area. Sources from the early 20th century describe it as dark-coloured; according to the breed standard, it should be white.

It is one of the forty-two autochthonous local sheep breeds of limited distribution for which a herdbook is kept by the Associazione Nazionale della Pastorizia, the Italian national association of sheep-breeders; the herdbook is empty. The breed numbered about 15,000 in 1983. No numbers have been reported to DAD-IS or published since that date.
