= Saltasassi =

Italian breed of sheep

- Conservation status: FAO (2007): endangered; DAD-IS (2025): at risk/critical
- Country of origin: Italy
- Distribution: Verbano Cusio Ossola; Novara

Traits
- Weight: Male: 60 kg; Female: 45–50 kg
- Height: Male: 60–65 cm; Female: 55 cm
- Wool colour: white
- Face colour: white

The Saltasassi is an Italian breed of upland sheep, reared for meat. It originates in the provinces of Verbano Cusio Ossola and Novara in the northern part of Piemonte, in north-west Italy. It is one of the forty-two autochthonous local sheep breeds of limited distribution for which a herd-book is kept by the Associazione Nazionale della Pastorizia, the Italian national association of sheep-breeders.

The population in 1983 was estimated at 2500. In 2013 the total number for the breed was not recorded; in 2012 it was 37. A study conducted by the region of Piemonte in the year 2000 found the Saltasassi to be virtually extinct. At the end of 2020 the population numbered six head – five ewes and a ram; in 2025 the conservation status of the breed was listed in DAD-IS as "at risk/critical".
