= Sambucana =

Breed of sheep

- Other names: Demontina
- Country of origin: Italy

Traits
- Weight: Male: 90 kg; Female: 71 kg
- Wool color: straw-white
- Face color: straw-white

Notes
- dual-purpose, meat and wool

The Sambucana or Demontina is a breed of upland sheep from the province of Cuneo, in Piemonte, north-west Italy. It takes its name from the comune of Sambuco in the Valle Stura di Demonte, the area where it is thought to have originated; the other name of the breed, Demontina, derives from the name of that valley. The Sambucana is also raised in the adjoining valleys, the Valle Gesso, the Valle Grana and the Valle Maira. It is one of the forty-two autochthonous local sheep breeds of limited distribution for which a herdbook is kept by the Associazione Nazionale della Pastorizia, the Italian national association of sheep-breeders.

In 2013 the total number for the breed was 3490.
