= Pomarancina =

Breed of sheep

- Country of origin: Italy

Traits
- Weight: Male: 60–75 kg; Female: 55–65 kg
- Wool color: white
- Face color: white

Notes
- principally for meat

The Pomarancina is a breed of domestic sheep from Tuscany in central Italy. It is raised mainly in the comune of Pomarance, from which it takes its name, and in the neighbouring comuni of Castelnuovo di Val di Cecina, Montecatini Val di Cecina and Volterra, all in the province of Pisa; some are kept in other parts of Tuscany, in the provinces of Grosseto, Livorno, Lucca and Siena. It is one of the forty-two autochthonous local sheep breeds of limited distribution for which a herdbook is kept by the Associazione Nazionale della Pastorizia, the Italian national association of sheep-breeders.

In 2013 total numbers for the breed were 1727.
