= Garessina =

Breed of sheep

- Conservation status: FAO (2007): not listed
- Other names: Muma; Razza di Garessio
- Country of origin: Italy
- Distribution: province of Cuneo
- Standard: MIPAAF
- Use: triple-purpose, milk, meat and wool

Traits
- Weight: Male: 50–55 kg; Female: 45–50 kg
- Height: Male: 60–65 cm; Female: 55–60 cm
- Skin color: pinkish
- Wool color: straw-white
- Face color: white
- Horn status: hornless in both sexes

The Garessina or Muma is a breed of small sheep from the Garessina, the area surrounding Garessio in the province of Cuneo, in Piemonte in north-west Italy. It is raised principally in the valleys of the Tanaro, its affluent the Negrone, and the Casotto; it is not raised commercially, but kept as a family sheep. It has been influenced by Spanish Merino and French Alpine breeds. The wool is of fine quality. The Garessina is one of the forty-two autochthonous local sheep breeds of limited distribution for which a herdbook is kept by the Associazione Nazionale della Pastorizia, the Italian national association of sheep-breeders.

Under the national Piano Sviluppo Regionale or regional development plan for 2000–2006, a subsidy was available for those who kept Garessina sheep; in 2004 it was claimed for 64 head. In 2013 the total number recorded for the breed was 110.
