= Vissana =

Breed of sheep

- Conservation status: possibly extinct
- Country of origin: Italy
- Distribution: Marche, Tuscany, Umbria
- Use: triple-purpose: meat, milk, wool

Traits
- Weight: Male: 50–55 kg; Female: 40–45 kg
- Height: Male: 70 cm; Female: 60 cm
- Wool color: white
- Face color: white, sometimes marked with brown or grey

Notes
- triple-purpose, meat, milk and wool

The Vissana is a breed of domestic sheep from the province of Macerata, in the Marche in central Italy. It may be extinct. It takes its name from the comune of Visso in the Monti Sibillini, and is or was raised mostly in that area, extending also into Umbria and Tuscany; herds under transhumant management formerly over-wintered in Lazio . Cross-breeding with the Comisana, the Sarda and the Sopravissana may have contributed to a substantial decline in breed numbers which was noted in the 1980s. The Vissana is one of the forty-two autochthonous local sheep breeds of limited distribution for which a herdbook is kept by the Associazione Nazionale della Pastorizia, the Italian national association of sheep-breeders.

In 1983 the breed numbered about 1000. A total number for the breed has not been recorded in the herdbook for many years. Numbers have not been reported to DAD-IS since 2000.
