= Sopravissana =

Italian breed of sheep

- Country of origin: Italy
- Use: triple-purpose: meat, milk and wool

Traits
- Weight: Male: 66 kg; Female: 50 kg
- Height: Male: 70 cm; Female: 60 cm
- Wool colour: white
- Face colour: white

The Sopravissana is a breed of domestic sheep from the province of Macerata, in the Marche in central Italy. The name derives from the area of origin, the comune of Visso in the Monti Sibillini; it was traditionally raised mostly in that area, but flocks ranged into Lazio, Tuscany and Umbria. The Sopravissana derives from the cross-breeding of local ewes with Spanish and French Rambouillet Merino rams in the eighteenth century. It is larger than the Vissana breed from the same area.

== History ==
The Sopravissana originated in the area of the comuni of Visso, from which the name derives, Castelsantangelo sul Nera and Ussita, in the Monti Sibillini, and was traditionally raised mostly in that area. It derived from the cross-breeding of local Apennine ewes with Spanish Merino and French Rambouillet Merino rams in the second half of the eighteenth century, principally on the masserie (estates) of the Piscini and Rosi families. Flocks under transhumant management ranged into Lazio, Tuscany and Umbria.

The Sopravissana is one of the seventeen autochthonous Italian sheep breeds for which a genealogical herd-book is kept by the Associazione Nazionale della Pastorizia, the Italian national association of sheep-breeders. The breed numbered about 1,200,000 in 1960, and 765,000 in 1970; by 1995 the number had fallen to about 6000. In 2013 total numbers recorded for the breed were 5699.

== Use ==
The Sopravissana is a triple-purpose breed, reared for meat, milk and wool. Modern breeding is aimed at improvement of its qualities as a meat breed, and at improving prolificacy by increasing the twinning rate and reducing the parturition interval.
