= Frabosana =

Breed of sheep

- Conservation status: FAO (2007): not at risk
- Other names: Roascia; Roaschino
- Country of origin: Italy
- Distribution: province of Cuneo; province of Turin
- Standard: MIPAAF
- Use: triple-purpose, principally for milk

Traits
- Weight: Male: 75–85 kg; Female: 65–80 kg
- Height: Male: 80–90 cm; Female: 65–80 cm
- Wool color: white
- Face color: white
- Horn status: usually horned

The Frabosana is a breed of sheep from the valleys of the Monregalese, the area around Mondovì in the province of Cuneo, in Piemonte in north-west Italy. It takes its name from the comuni of Frabosa Soprana and Frabosa Sottana, and was once the most numerous sheep breed of Piemonte. It is raised in the Valle Gesso, the Valle Grana, the Valle Pesio, the Valle Vermenagna and the Valli Monregalesi (all in the province of Cuneo), and in the Val Pellice (in the province of Turin). Two types are recognised within the breed, the Roaschino in the Ligurian Alps, and the slightly smaller Frabosana raised in the area of Mondovì. The Frabosana is one of the forty-two autochthonous local sheep breeds of limited distribution for which a herdbook is kept by the Associazione Nazionale della Pastorizia, the Italian national association of sheep-breeders.

The conservation status of the breed was listed as "not at risk" by the Food and Agriculture Organization of the United Nations in 2007. In 2013 total numbers for the breed were 4284.
