= Biellese =

Breed of sheep

- Conservation status: FAO (2007): not at risk
- Other names: Razza d'Ivrea; Piemontese Alpina
- Country of origin: Italy
- Distribution: Piedmont; northern Italy
- Standard: MIPAAF
- Use: formerly dual-purpose, meat/milk; now principally for meat

Traits
- Weight: Male: 100 kg; Female: 82 kg
- Height: Male: 86 cm; Female: 81 cm
- Skin color: pinkish
- Wool color: white
- Face color: white
- Horn status: hornless in both sexes

The Biellese is a breed of large domestic sheep indigenous to the province of Biella, in Piedmont in north-western Italy, from which it takes its name. It may also be known as the Razza d'Ivrea, after the town of Ivrea, or as the Piemontese Alpina. The Biellese is one of the seventeen autochthonous Italian sheep breeds for which a genealogical herdbook is kept by the Associazione Nazionale della Pastorizia, the Italian national association of sheep-breeders.

== History ==
The origins of the Biellese breed are unknown. In the early part of the twentieth century it was considered by some to be a sub-type of the Bergamasca breed; others did not share this view. The much-reported derivation of it, with the Bergamasca and other Alpine breeds, from Sudanese sheep is a hypothesis published in 1886 in the Traité de zootechnie of André Sanson, and is based on craniometry; it has no foundation in science. The breed was numerous in the area of Biella; in 1942 numbers were estimated at 40,000. As with many other Italian breeds, numbers dropped sharply after the Second World War. However, interest in the breed revived in the 1960s; the breed was officially recognised in 1985 by the then Ministero dell'Agricoltura e delle Foreste, and a herdbook was established in 1986. By 1994 there were more than 50,000 head, of which 1900 were registered in the herdbook. At the end of 2013 the total number registered was 1016; there has been no recent census of unregistered stock.

== Use and management ==
The Biellese was formerly considered a dual-purpose breed, yielding meat and wool; it is now kept now principally for meat production. Lambs are usually slaughtered at a weight of 12–15 kg, or rarely at 18–20 kg. Some wether mutton from castrated animals slaughtered at 12–18 months is sold in the markets of Milan and Ravenna; there is demand from some immigrant communities for large entire (uncastrated) lambs. The wool is of carpet quality; rams yield about 3.5 kg, ewes about 3 kg, per year.

The Biellese is commonly used for hybridisation with other breeds such as the Frabosana, the Garessina, the Sambucana and the Savoiarda to improve meat yield and growth rate.

As in the past, management of the Biellese is most often transhumant: the flocks are kept on alpine pasture from June to October, and over-winter in the valleys, where they are fed hay. About 75% of the population is managed in this way. Management of a further 20%, mostly in the area of origin, is nomadic; these are often kept in relatively large flocks of 800–1000 head. Only a small percentage are kept in the same place year-round.
