= Massese sheep =

Italian breed of sheep

Massese
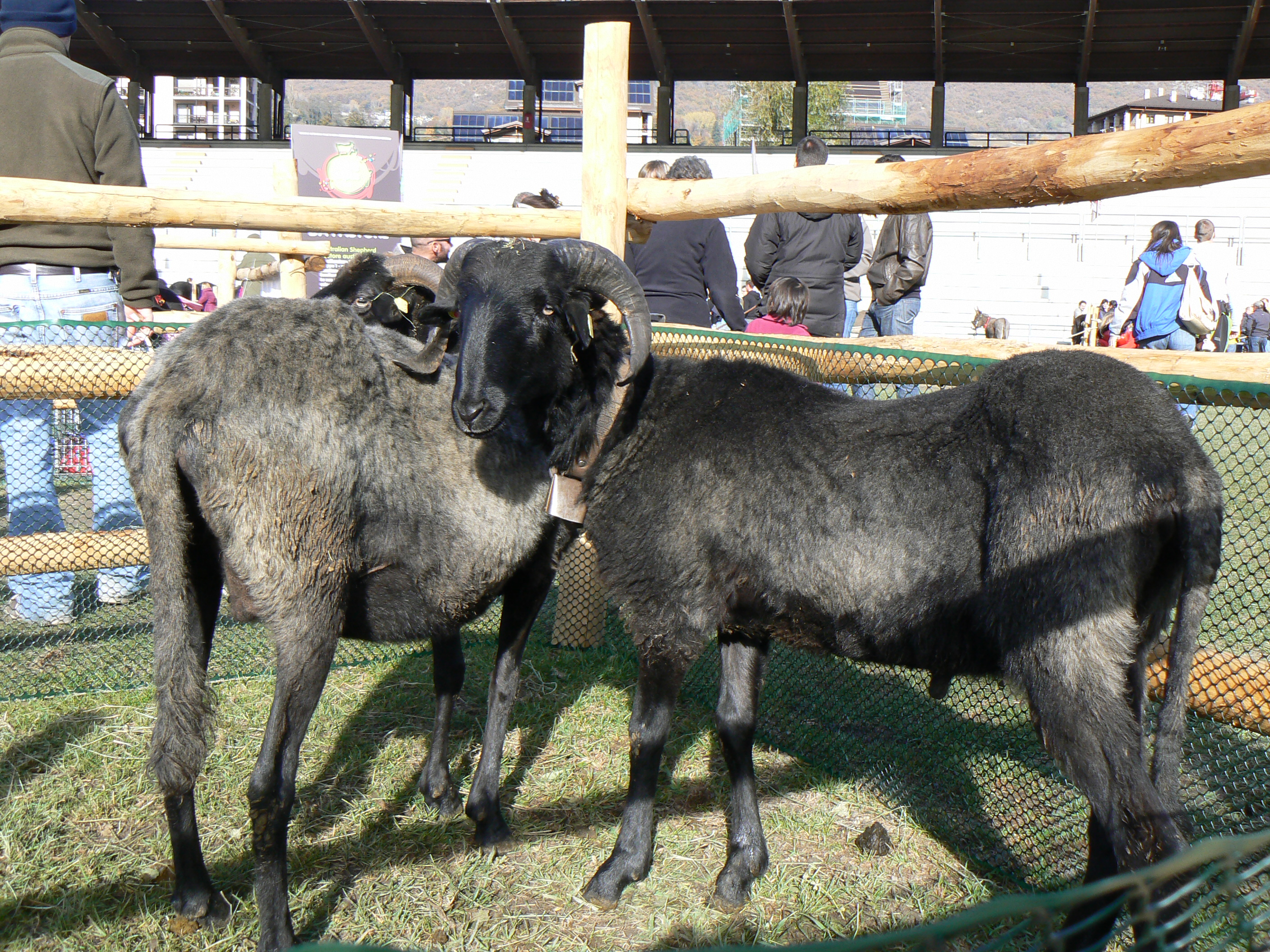
- Country of origin: Italy
- Distribution: Tuscany; Emilia–Romagna; Liguria; Umbria
- Use: principally milk, also meat

Traits
- Weight: Male: 90 kg; Female: 65 kg
- Height: Male: 85 cm; Female: 77 cm
- Wool colour: lead-grey to black
- Face colour: black

Notes
- horned in both sexes

The Massese is an Italian breed of domestic sheep from the Alpi Apuane mountains of the province of Massa Carrara, in Tuscany in central Italy. It takes its name from the town of Massa. It is raised throughout most of Tuscany, and also in Emilia–Romagna, Liguria and Umbria. It has common origins with the other indigenous sheep breeds of the Apennines.

== History ==
The Massese has common origins with the other indigenous sheep breeds of the Apennines. It is one of the seventeen autochthonous Italian sheep breeds for which a genealogical herd-book is kept by the Associazione Nazionale della Pastorizia, the Italian national association of sheep-breeders. The herd-book was established in 1971. In 1986 total numbers for the breed were recorded as 182690, of which 66% were in Tuscany and 27% in Emilia–Romagna. In 2006 the population was estimated at 55000, of which 16477 were registered in the herd-book; in 2013 the number recorded in the herd-book was 8423.

== Use ==
The Massese remains in oestrus throughout the year, and normally lambs three times every two years; this, coupled with a twinning rate of 135%, allows production of two lambs per year. The lambs are slaughtered at a weight of 10–15 kg.

The milk yield is about 120 ± 32 litres per lactation for primiparous, and 138 ± 45 litres for pluriparous, ewes; it may reach 300–350 litres per lactation. The milk has on average 6.2% fat and 5.3% protein.
