= Lamon sheep =

Breed of sheep

Lamon
- Other names: Lamonese; Feltrina
- Country of origin: Italy

Traits
- Weight: Male: 77 kg; Female: 67 kg
- Wool color: white
- Face color: mottled with brown or black

Notes
- formerly triple-purpose, milk, meat and wool; today principally for meat

The Lamon or Lamonese is a breed of sheep from the comuni of Lamon and Sovramonte in the province of Belluno, in the Veneto in north-east Italy. The area is known as the Feltrino, from the town of Feltre, and the breed may also be referred to as the Feltrina. It was formerly widely distributed in the Veneto and the Trentino, and as far as the province of Mantova in Lombardy. In the 1950s there was an attempt to increase the size by cross-breeding with the Bergamasca; there was also some cross-breeding with the Padovana and the now extinct Trentina. The Lamon is one of the forty-two autochthonous local sheep breeds of limited distribution for which a herdbook is kept by the Associazione Nazionale della Pastorizia, the Italian national association of sheep-breeders.

Breed numbers fell drastically in the second half of the 20th century, from 10,000 in 1960 to 177 in 2000. In 2013 total numbers for the breed were 240.
