= Polled livestock =

Hornless livestock

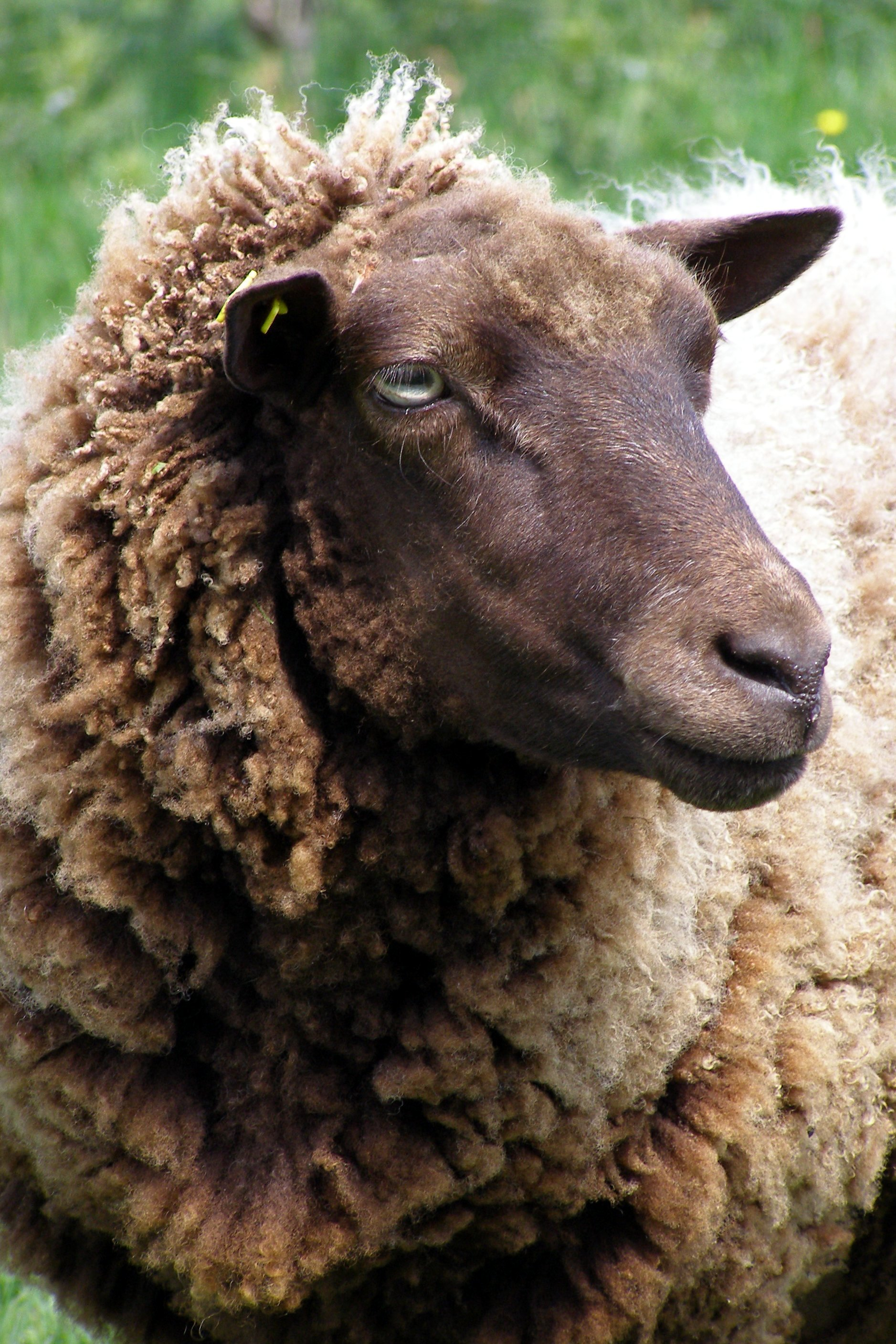
This Shetland ewe is naturally polled

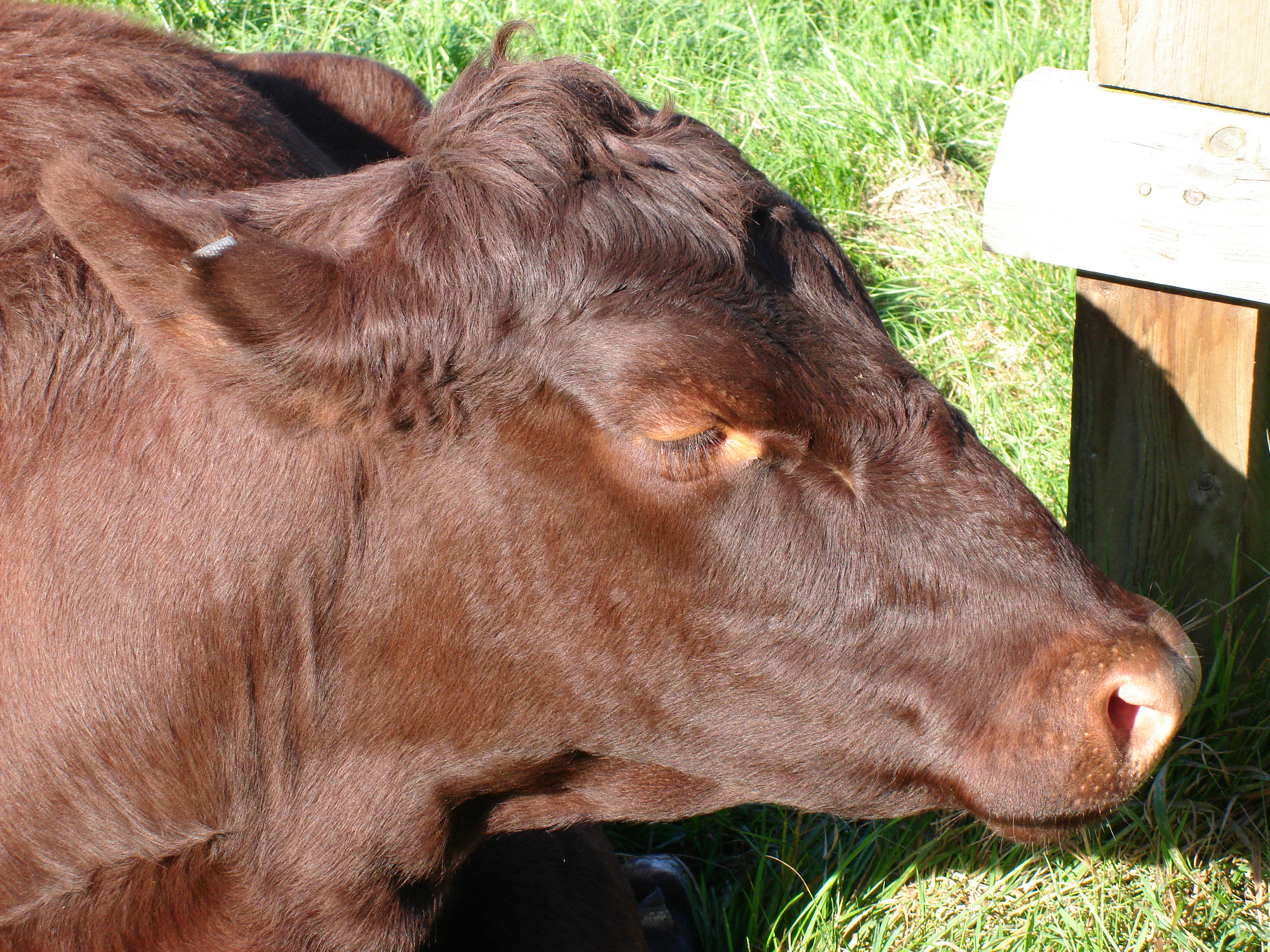
A Red Poll bullock

Polled livestock are livestock without horns in species which are normally horned. The term refers to both breeds and strains that are naturally polled through selective breeding and also to naturally horned animals that have been disbudded. Natural polling occurs in cattle, yaks, water buffalo, and goats, and in these animals it affects both sexes equally; in sheep, typically, by contrast, both sexes may be horned, both polled, or only the females polled. However, there remain some sheep breeds which also exhibit natural polling in both sexes, such as the White Dorper and Black Dorper. The history of breeding polled livestock starts about 6000 years BC.

== Terminology ==
The archaic term muley or mulley is sometimes used to refer to hornless livestock (especially cattle) in folk songs, folk tales, and poetry, and in the name of the polled Irish Moiled cattle breed. "Muley" derives from Irish and Scottish Gaelic maol, and Welsh moel.

== Genetics ==
In cattle, the polled allele is genetically dominant to that for horns. The polled trait is far more common in beef breeds than in dairy breeds. CRISPR technology is being developed to create polled versions of dairy breeds.

In sheep, the allele for horns in both sexes is partially dominant to the allele for being polled in both sexes, and both of these are dominant to that for polling in the female only.

The development of true breeding polled goats is discouraged as the polled locus is strongly associated with Polled Intersex Syndrome (PIS).

Naturally polled water buffalo also have genital defects.

== Scurs ==
Naturally polled animals may have scurs – small, loose, horny growths in the skin where their horns would be. In cattle, this trait has been traced to a separate gene (on a different chromosome) from that responsible for polling. However, the presence of the allele for scurs in cattle can only be seen in a polled animal, because horns replace the scurs in horned animals. Similar scurs may also occur where disbudding of a naturally horned animal has been incomplete.

== Reasons for polling ==
Polled livestock are preferred by many farmers for a variety of reasons, the foremost being that horns can pose a physical danger to humans, other livestock and equipment. Horns may also interfere with equipment used with livestock (such as a cattle crush), or they may become damaged during handling.

In other circumstances, horned animals may be preferred, for example, to help the animal defend itself against predators, to allow the attachment of head yokes to draught oxen, to provide a hand-hold on smaller animals such as sheep, or for aesthetic reasons – in some breeds the retention of horns is required for showing.

In the US no show requires horns to be left on. Most shows require at a minimum blunting of the horns to a minimum diameter of 1/2 inch. Boer Goat Shows allow disbudded goats. Dairy breeds of goats are required to be naturally hornless or disbudded. 4H and FFA show goats must be hornless or blunted so as not to be sharp and dangerous.

== Development of polled strains ==
Polled strains have been developed of many cattle breeds which were originally horned. This has usually been done by crossing with naturally polled breeds, most commonly Angus and Galloway cattle. For example, polled Jersey cattle originated in Ohio sometime prior to 1895. Two strains were developed, the first to appear being founded by crosses of registered Jersey bulls (the standard) on common muley (hornless) cows. These were graded up by the continued use of purebred Jersey sires, selection being made of the polled offspring of each generation, the horned progeny being discarded. Thus originated what was later known as the single-standard strain. As in the case of the Polled Shorthorns and Polled Herefords, the development of the single-standard strain was soon followed by the appearance of a double-standard strain, founded by a few naturally hornless sports that were discovered in registered herds of horned Jersey cattle. These standards were bred among themselves or crossed with registered horned Jerseys, followed by selection for the polled head, and the strain was developed in this way.

== See also ==
- Castration
- Docking
- Livestock dehorning
- List of cattle breeds
- List of domestic Asian water buffalo breeds
- List of sheep breeds
- List of goat breeds
