= Bergamasca sheep =

Breed of sheep

Bergamasca
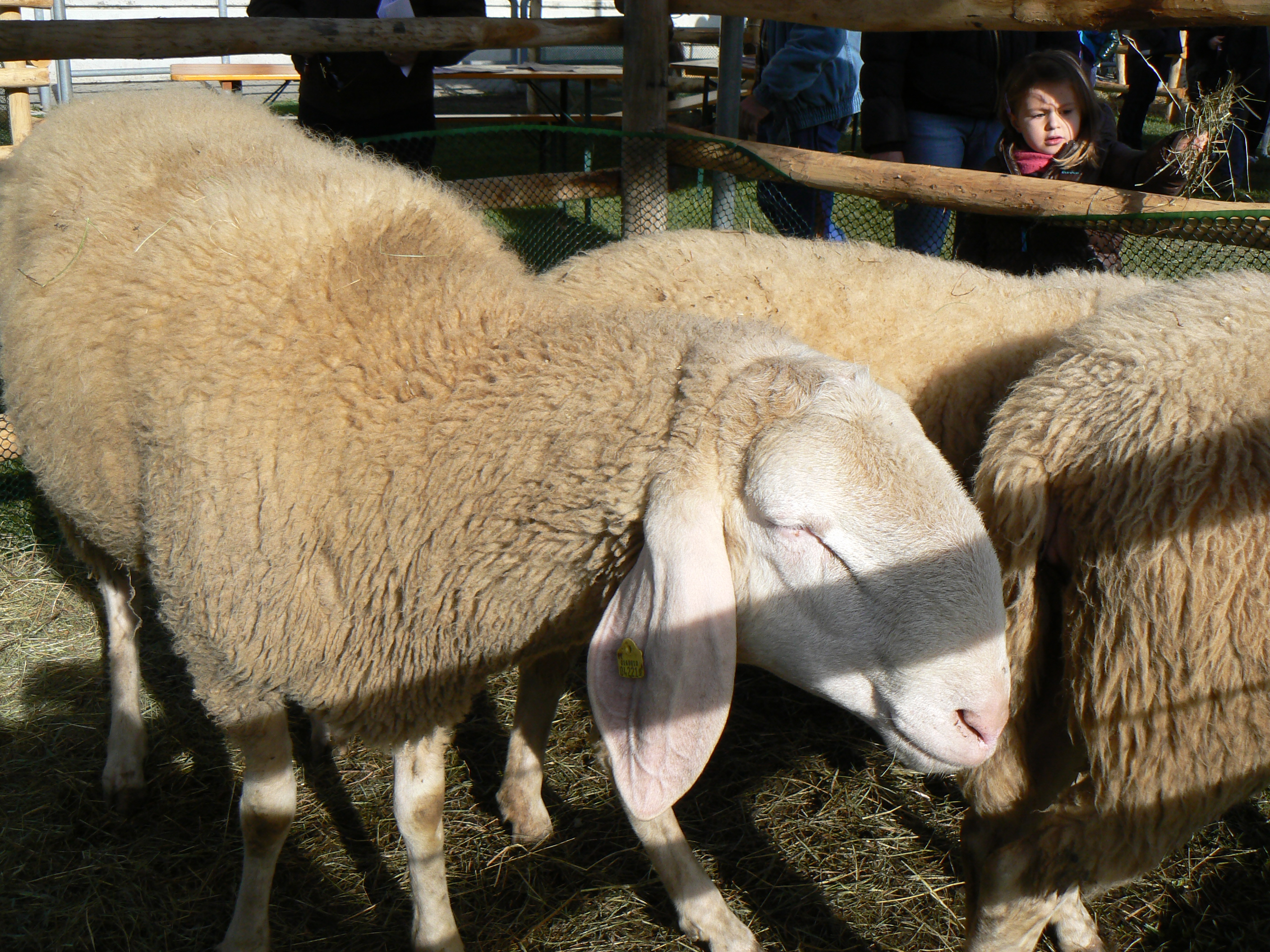
- Conservation status: FAO (2007): not at risk
- Country of origin: Italy
- Distribution: mainland Italy; Brazil; Serbia; Venezuela
- Standard: MIPAAF
- Use: principally for meat

Traits
- Weight: Male: 111 kg; Female: 80 kg
- Height: Male: 87 cm; Female: 79 cm
- Skin color: pinkish
- Wool color: white
- Face color: white
- Horn status: hornless in both sexes

The Bergamasca is a breed of domestic sheep from the mountainous part of the province of Bergamo, in Lombardy in northern Italy. It originates from the area of the Val Brembana and the Val Seriana valleys, and is particularly associated with the plateau of Clusone. By the beginning of the 20th century it had spread through much of Lombardy; it is now raised in most parts of mainland Italy, particularly the province of Teramo in Abruzzo, where more than 80% of the registered stock are kept. The Bergamasca is also present in Brazil, Serbia and Venezuela. It is raised principally for meat, and is often used for cross-breeding with other meat breeds to improve meat yield. In Lombardy, it is traditionally raised by transhumant management: the herds spend the summers on the alpine pasture, and over-winter in the Po Valley.

It is one of the seventeen autochthonous Italian sheep breeds for which a genealogical herdbook is kept by the Associazione Nazionale della Pastorizia, the Italian national association of sheep-breeders.

In 1983 the breed was estimated to number 95,000 head, of which 7900 were registered in the herdbook. In 2013 the registered stock numbered 12,042, of which 9833 were in the province of Teramo.

== Characteristics ==
The Bergamasca is white. Rams weigh 105 kg (231 lb) and grow to 90 cm (35 in) at the withers on average. At maturity on average, ewes weigh 82 kg (181 lb) and grow to 80 cm (31 in) at the withers.
