= Associazione Nazionale della Pastorizia =

Italian agency for the administration of sheep- and goat-breeding

- Type: national association
- Purpose: administration of breeds of sheep and goat
- Headquarters: 1587 Viale Palmiro Togliatti, 00155 Roma
- Region served: Italy
- Official language: Italian
- President: Marco Antonio Scalas
- Affiliations: Ministero delle Politiche Agricole, Alimentari e Forestali
- Website: assonapa.it

The Associazione Nazionale della Pastorizia, or roughly "national association of pastoralists", is the Italian national body responsible for the administration of sheep- and goat-breeding. It maintains the herd books for more than a hundred indigenous breeds of sheep and goats. It records breed numbers and submits them twice yearly to DAD-IS, and keeps records for all breeders of sheep and goats in the country.

== Breeds ==
The association maintains genealogical herdbooks for seventeen principal breeds of sheep, of which eight – the Altamurana, Comisana, Delle Langhe, Leccese, Massese, Pinzirita, Sarda and Valle del Belice – are milk breeds. Nine – the Appenninica, Barbaresca, Bergamasca, Biellese, Fabrianese, Gentile di Puglia, Laticauda, Merinizzata Italiana and Sopravissana — are meat breeds. It also maintains genealogical herd books for the eight principal goat breeds, the Camosciata delle Alpi or Chamois Coloured Goat, the Garganica, Girgentana, Jonica, Maltese, Orobica, Rossa Mediterranea, Saanen and Sarda. A less stringent herd book is kept for forty-six indigenous sheep breeds and forty-three goat breeds of limited distribution. (Note: For reasons that are not clear, the Valgerola breed of goat, which is considered to be the same as the Orobica, is separately reported to DAD-IS and is included in the list of goat breeds of limited distribution; if it is excluded, the total number of such breeds is forty-two rather than forty-three.)
