= Ark of Taste =

Catalogue of endangered foods

The Ark of Taste is an international catalogue of endangered heritage foods which is maintained by the global Slow Food movement. The Ark is designed to preserve at-risk foods that are sustainably produced, unique in taste, and part of a distinct ecoregion. Contrary to the most literal definition of plant and animal conservation, the Ark of Taste aims to maintain edibles in its purview by actively encouraging their cultivation for consumption. By doing so, Slow Food hopes to promote the growing and eating of foods which are sustainable and preserve biodiversity in the human food chain.

The list is intended to include foods which are rare, and are "culturally or historically linked to a specific region, locality, ethnicity or traditional production practice". Which foods meet these criteria is decided by an adjudicating committee made up of members of the Slow Food nonprofit organization; all candidates go through a formal nomination process which includes tastings and identification of producers within the region.

Since the foundation of the Ark in 1996, 5,312 products (as of September 2021) from over 130 countries have been included. The list includes not only prepared foods and food products, but also a great many livestock breeds, as well as vegetable and fruit cultivars. All foods in the catalogue are accompanied by a list of resources for those wishing to grow or buy them.

== List of Ark of Taste foods ==
=== In Italy ===
Ark of Taste Foods in Italy
Food	State/region	Food type
Acquaviva red onion	Apulia	Onions
Bionda dell'Adamello	Lombardy	Goat breed
Aged Asiago cheese	Veneto	Cheese
Agerola Fior di Latte	Campania	Cheeses and dairy products
Agerolese cattle	Campania	Cattle breed
Agnone Caciocavallo	Molise	Cheeses and dairy products
Ahrntaler Graukäse	Trentino-Alto Adige/Südtirol	Cheeses and dairy products
Albenga Violet asparagus	Liguria	Vegetables
Alburni Caciocavallo Podolico	Campania	Cheeses and dairy products
Alcamo Porceddu melon	Sicily	Fruit
Alpagota lamb	Veneto	Sheep breed
Altamurana sheep	Apulia	Sheep breed
Amalfi Sfusato lemon	Campania	Lemons
Ancona Crocetta	Marche	Fish
Aquilano Caciofiore	Abruzzo	Cheeses and dairy products
Aspromonte Caprino	Calabria	Cheeses and dairy products
Badalucco, Conio and Pigna beans	Liguria	Pulses
Bagnolese Pecorino	Campania	Cheeses and dairy products
Bagnolese sheep	Campania	Sheep breed
Bagolino Bagòss	Lombardy	Cheeses and dairy products
Bale d'asu	Piedmont	Cured meats
Banale Ciuighe	Trentino-Alto Adige/Südtirol	Cured meats
Basilican Podolico Caciocavallo	Basilicata	Cheeses and dairy products
Bazzone Prosciutto	Tuscany	Cured meats
Valle del Belice sheep	Sicily	Sheep breed
Belìce Vastedda	Sicily	Cheeses and dairy products
Bella-Muro sausage	Basilicata	Cured meats
Belmonte tomato	Calabria	Tomatoes
Bergamot orange	Calabria	Fruit
Bettelmatt	Piedmont	Cheeses and dairy products
Biancoperla corn	Veneto	Grains/cereals
Bitter orange flower water	Liguria	Spirits
Bitto of the valleys around Valtelline	Lombardy	Cheeses and dairy products
Bivona peach	Sicily	Peaches
Calabrese	Calabria	Pig breed
Casertana	Campania	Pig breed
Black cherry wine	Marche	Must and wine-based drinks
Black Sicilian bee	Sicily	Bee breed
Bolli alla livornese	Tuscany	Cakes and biscuits
Bra sausage	Piedmont	Cured meats
Brigasca sheep	Liguria	Sheep breed
Brigasca Sheep Tomas	Liguria	Cheeses and dairy products
Bronte pistachio	Sicily	Fruit
Bruzzu	Liguria	Cheeses and dairy products
Buras apple	Piedmont	Apple variety
Burlina cattle	Veneto	Cattle breed
Cabannina cattle	Liguria	Cattle breed
Cabras Mullet Roe	Sardinia	Preserved fish
Caciofiore	Apulia	Cheeses and dairy products
Caciofiore of the Roman Countryside	Lazio	Cheeses and dairy products
Calvana cattle	Tuscany	Cattle breed
Calvilla apple	Piedmont	Apple variety
Mortadella di Campotosto	Abruzzo	Cured meats
Cancellara Sausage	Basilicata	Cured meats
Canestrato	Sicily	Cheeses and dairy products
Canestrato Pugliese	Apulia	Cheeses and dairy products
Cantiano Black Cherry	Marche	Vegetable preserves
Capracotta Pecorino	Molise	Cheeses and dairy products
Caprauna turnip	Piedmont	Vegetable variety
Capriglio pepper, peperone di Capriglio	Piedmont	Pepper variety
Caprino Ossolano	Piedmont	Cheeses and dairy products
Cardoon honey	Sardinia	Honeys
Carla apple	Piedmont	Apple variety
Carmagnola grey rabbit	Piedmont	Rabbits
Carmagnola Ox-Horn Pepper	Piedmont	Pepper variety
Carmasciano	Campania	Cheeses and dairy products
Carmignano Dried Fig	Tuscany	Vegetable preserves
Carnia	Veneto	Cheeses and dairy products
Carnia or Cuc	Friuli-Venezia Giulia	Cheeses and dairy products
Carosello	Apulia	Vegetables
Carpino Broad Beans	Apulia	Bean variety
Casentino Prosciutto	Tuscany	Cured meats
Casizolu	Sardinia	Cheeses and dairy products
Casola Chestnut Bread	Tuscany	Bread
Casoperuto	Campania	Cheeses and dairy products
Castagna Del Prete (chestnut)	Campania	Vegetable preserves
Castel del Monte Canestrato	Abruzzo	Cheeses and dairy products
Castelfranco Variegato	Veneto	Vegetables
Castellammare Violet Artichoke	Campania	Vegetables
Castelvetrano Black Bread	Sicily	Bread
Casu Axedu	Sardinia	Cheeses and dairy products
Casu Marzu	Sardinia	Cheeses and dairy products
Cavalese Caprino	Trentino-Alto Adige/Südtirol	Cheeses and dairy products
Certaldo Onion	Tuscany	Onion variety
Cervia Artisan Sea Salt	Emilia Romagna	Herbs and aromas
Cetica Red Potato	Tuscany	Potato variety
Ciaculli Late-Winter Mandarin	Sicily	Citrus variety
Ciarimbolo	Marche	Cured meats
Ciavàr, mad sausage	Emilia Romagna	Cured meats
Cilavegna Asparagus	Lombardy	Vegetable variety
Cilentana Goat	Campania	Goat breed
Cilento Dotted Fig	Campania	Fruit
Cilento Goat Cacioricotta	Campania	Cheeses and dairy products
Cinisara cattle	Sicily	Cattle breed
Cinisara Cattle Caciocavallo	Sicily	Cheeses and dairy products
Cinque Terre Sciacchetrà	Liguria	Wine
Cinta Senese pig	Tuscany	Pig breed
Classic Mortadella	Emilia Romagna	Cured meats
Coazze Cevrin	Piedmont	Cheeses and dairy products
Cocomerina Pear	Emilia Romagna	Pear variety
Coggiola Paletta	Piedmont	Cured meats
Colaz	Friuli-Venezia Giulia	Oven-baked product
Colli Bolognesi Sweet Pecorino	Emilia Romagna	Cheeses and dairy products
Colonnata Lardo	Tuscany	Cured meats
Commercio Apple	Emilia Romagna	Apple variety
Conca Casale Signora	Molise	Cured meats
Controne Bean	Campania	Pulses
Corbara plum tomato	Campania	Tomato variety
Crotonese Canestrato	Calabria	Cheeses and dairy products
Cuccalar	Trentino-Alto Adige/Südtirol	Bread
Dandelion honey	Piedmont	Honey
Decollatura Soppressata	Calabria	Cured meats
Delia Cuddrireddra	Sicily	Cakes and biscuits
Desulo Ham	Sardinia	Cured meats
Diamante Smooth Lime	Calabria	Fruit variety
Dominici apple	Piedmont	Apple variety
Donkey salami	Veneto	Cured meats
Dried Calizzano and Murialdo Chestnuts	Liguria	Vegetable preserves
Etna Silver goat	Sicily	Goat breed
Etna Tabacchiera peach	Sicily	Peach variety
Fabriano Salame	Marche	Cured meats
Fagagna Pestàt	Friuli-Venezia Giulia	Cured meats
Farindola Pecorino	Abruzzo	Cheeses and dairy products
Ferrandina baked olives	Basilicata	Vegetable preserve
Fig cake	Marche	Cakes and biscuits
Filiano pecorino	Basilicata	Cheeses and dairy products
Filindeu	Sardinia	Grains/cereals
Finale Carla apple	Liguria	Apple variety
Fiore Sardo shepherds' cheese	Sardinia	Cheeses and dairy products
Florentine Bardiccio	Tuscany	Cured meats
Floresta Provola	Sicily	Cheeses and dairy products
Formadi Frant	Friuli-Venezia Giulia	Cheeses and dairy products
Fortore ham	Campania	Cured meats
Frabosana sheep	Piedmont	Sheep breed
Francesca apple	Emilia Romagna	Apple variety
Frisa goat	Lombardy	Goat breed
Garbagna Bella cherry	Piedmont	Cherries
Garfagnana Biroldo	Tuscany	Cured meats
Garfagnana potato bread	Tuscany	Bread
Garfagnina cattle	Tuscany	Cattle breed
Garfagnina bianca sheep	Tuscany	Sheep breed
Gargano goat	Apulia	Goat breed
Podolica cattle from the Gargano	Apulia	Cattle breed
Gargano Podolico Caciocavallo	Apulia	Cheeses and dairy products
Gavi Testa in cassetta	Piedmont	Cured meats
Giarratana Onion	Sicily	Onions
Gioddu	Sardinia	Cheeses and dairy products
Gioi Soppressata	Campania	Cured meats
Girgentana Goat	Sicily	Goat breed
Goose in Onto	Veneto	Preserves
Gota (pig cheek salame)	Emilia Romagna	Cured meats
Grappa Morlacco Cheese	Veneto	Cheeses and dairy products
Gravina Pallone	Apulia and Basilicata	Cheeses and dairy products
Gressoney Toma	Valle d'Aosta	Cheeses and dairy products
Tyrolese Grey Cattle	Trentino-Alto Adige/Südtirol	Cattle breed
Guilmi sausage	Abruzzo	Cured meats
High mountain Agordo cheese	Veneto	Cheeses and dairy products
Horse coppietta	Lazio	Cured meats
Iblei Mountains thyme honey	Sicily	Honey
Interdonato lemon	Sicily	Lemon variety
Ischia Cave rabbit	Campania	Rabbit
Lake Trasimeno bean	Umbria	Vegetables
Lampascioni	Apulia	Vegetables
Langan sheep tuma	Piedmont	Cheeses and dairy products
Langhe sheep	Piedmont	Sheep breed
Late-Harvest Leonforte Peaches	Sicily	Peach variety
Laticauda pecorino	Campania	Cheeses and dairy products
Laticauda sheep	Campania	Sheep breed
Lemon-shaped Cacio	Marche	Cheeses and dairy products
Leonforte broad bean	Sicily	Pulses
Limoncella apple	Campania	Apple variety
Lodi Pannerone	Lombardy	Cheeses and dairy products
Londa Regina peaches	Tuscany	Peach variety
Macagn	Piedmont	Cheeses and dairy products
Madernassa pear	Piedmont	Pear variety
Madonie Manna	Sicily	Vegetable preserves
Madonie Provola	Sicily	Cheeses and dairy products
Magghia Masculina	Sicily	Fish
Magnana apple	Piedmont	Apple variety
Maiorchino	Sicily	Cheeses and dairy products
Malga Mount Veronese	Veneto	Cheeses and dairy products
Mallegato	Tuscany	Cured meats
Manteca	Basilicata and Campania	Cheeses and dairy products
Mantovana pink apple	Emilia Romagna	Apple variety
Marceddì Arselle	Sardinia	Fish
Marcetto	Abruzzo	Cheeses and dairy products
Marcundela	Friuli-Venezia Giulia	Cured meats
Maremmana	Tuscany	Cattle breed
Mariola	Emilia Romagna	Cured meats
Martin Dubi pear	Piedmont	Pear variety
Martin Sec pear	Piedmont	Pear variety
Martina Franca Capocollo	Apulia	Cured meats
Martinone pear	Piedmont	Pear variety
Marzolina	Lazio	Cheeses and dairy products
Marzotica	Apulia	Cheeses and dairy products
Masedu artichoke	Sardinia	Vegetable variety
Matera bread	Basilicata	Cattle breed
Materana Mountain Pezzente	Basilicata	Cured meats
Mazzi	Lazio	Cured meats
Menaica anchovies	Campania	Preserved fish
Merca	Sardinia	Preserved fish
Mezzago asparagus	Lombardy	Vegetable variety
Minuta olive	Sicily	Fruit
Bianca Modenese cattle	Emilia Romagna	Cattle breed
Moena Puzzone	Trentino-Alto Adige/Südtirol	Cheeses and dairy products
Molana	Liguria	Cheeses and dairy products
Moleche	Veneto	Fish
Moliterno Casieddu	Basilicata	Cheeses and dairy products
Moliterno Pecorino	Basilicata	Cheeses and dairy products
Monaco Provolone	Campania	Cheeses and dairy products
Mondovì cornmeal biscuits	Piedmont	Oven-baked products
Monreale white plums	Sicily	Fruit variety
Montasio d'alpeggio	Friuli-Venezia Giulia	Cheeses and dairy products
Monte Marzano Pecorino	Campania	Cheeses and dairy products
Monte Poro Pecorino	Calabria	Cheeses and dairy products
Montébore	Piedmont	Cheeses and dairy products
Montefalcone del Sannio Caprino	Molise	Cheeses and dairy products
Montenero di Bisaccia Ventricina	Molise	Cured meats
Monti Sibillini pecorino	Marche	Cheeses and dairy products
Montine asparagus	Veneto	Vegetable variety
Montoro Bronze onion	Campania	Onionvariety
Mora Romagnola pig	Emilia Romagna	Pig breed
Morano Felciata	Calabria	Cheeses and dairy products
Mormanno lentil	Calabria	Vegetables
Cappone di Morozzo, from Bionda Piemontese chicken	Piedmont	Breeds
Moscato Passito wine from Valle Bagnario	Piedmont	Wines
Motta squared pepper	Piedmont	Pepper variety
Mountain Castelmagno	Piedmont	Cheeses and dairy products
Mozzarella in Myrtle	Campania	Cheeses and dairy products
Murianengo or Moncenisio	Piedmont	Cheeses and dairy products
Musulupu	Calabria	Cheeses and dairy products
Napoletana goat	Campania	Goat breed
Napoli salami	Campania	Cured meats
Nassa shrimp	Campania	Fish
Neapolitan papaccella	Campania	Vegetables
Nero dei Nebrodi pig	Sicily	Pig breed
Nebrodi Provola	Sicily	Cheeses and dairy products
Nizza Monferrato "hunchback" cardoon	Piedmont	Vegetable variety
Noli anchovies	Liguria	Fish
Non Valley Mortandela	Trentino-Alto Adige/Südtirol	Cured meats
Noto almond	Sicily	Almond variety
Nùbia red garlic	Sicily	Garlic variety
Onano Lentil	Lazio	Pulses
Orbetello Bottarga	Tuscany	Preserved fish
Orobica goat	Lombardy	Goat breed
Osilo Pecorino	Sardinia	Cheeses and dairy products
Ottofile corn	Piedmont	Grains/cereals
Ozieri Copuleta	Sardinia	Cakes and biscuits
Paddaccio	Basilicata	Cheeses and dairy products
Padovana chicken	Veneto	Chicken breeds
Pantelleria caper	Pantelleria	Vegetable preserves
Pantesco donkey	Pantelleria	Donkey breeds
Pantelleria Zibibbo grapes	Pantelleria	Fruit variety
Peccioli Colombana grapes	Tuscany	Fruit variety
Petuccia and Peta	Friuli-Venezia Giulia	Cured meats
Pezzogna	Campania	Fish
Piacentino	Sicily	Cheeses and dairy products
Bionda Piemontese chicken	Piedmont	Chicken breeds
Piemontese cattle	Piedmont	Cattle breeds
Piennolo small tomato	Campania	Tomato variety
Pietraroja Prosciutto	Campania	Cured meats
Pisci Affumau	Sardinia	Preserved fish
Pistoian Mountain Pecorino	Tuscany	Cheeses and dairy products
Pitina	Friuli-Venezia Giulia	Cured meats
Podolica cattle	Basilicata	Cattle breeds
Poirino tench	Piedmont	Fish
Polizzi Badda bean	Sicily	Pulses
Pompìa	Sardinia	Fruit variety
Ponzone baciato filet	Piedmont	Cured meats
Portonovo wild mussel	Marche	Fish
Poverello bean	Calabria	Pulses
Prato Mortadella	Tuscany	Cured meats
Prescinseûa	Liguria	Cheeses and dairy products
Primiero mountain butter (Botìro di malga di Primiero)	Trentino-Alto Adige/Südtirol	Cheeses and dairy products
Procida lemon	Campania	Lemon variety
Quarantina Potato	Liguria	Potato variety
Radìc di mont	Friuli-Venezia Giulia	Vegetable variety
Ragusa Carrubo	Sicily	Fruit variety
Ragusano donkey	Sicily	Donkey breeds
Ragusano	Sicily	Cheeses and dairy products
Raschera d'alpeggio	Piedmont	Cheeses and dairy products
Rasco (cheese)	Calabria	Cheeses and dairy products
Reblec	Valle d'Aosta	Cheeses and dairy products
Rebruchon	Piedmont	Cheeses and dairy products
Reggiana Cattle	Emilia Romagna	Cattle breeds
Rendena cattle	Veneto	Cattle breeds
Resia garlic	Friuli-Venezia Giulia	Garlic variety
Rhododendron honey	Piedmont	Honeys
Ribera vanilla orange	Sicily	Orange variety
Ricotta Forte	Apulia	Cheeses and dairy products
Ricotta Infornata	Sicily	Cheeses and dairy products
Ricotta Mustia	Sardinia	Cheeses and dairy products
Rimella Caprino	Piedmont	Cheeses and dairy products
Rivello Soperzata	Basilicata	Cured meats
Robiola del Bec	Piedmont	Cheeses and dairy products
Robiola di Ceva or Mondovì	Piedmont	Cheeses and dairy products
Robiola of Roccaverano	Piedmont	Cheeses and dairy products
Roccaverano goat	Piedmont	Goat breed
Romagnola cattle	Emilia Romagna	Cattle breeds
Roman Conciato	Campania	Cheeses and dairy products
Roncallina apple	Liguria	Apple variety
Rosemary honey	Apulia and Sardinia	Honeys
Rotonda red eggplant	Basilicata	Vegetable variety
Rotonda tomato	Basilicata	Tomato variety
Roveja	Umbria	Pulses
Runsé apple	Piedmont	Apple variety
Saffron of l'Aquila	Abruzzo	Herbs and aromas
Salama da sugo	Emilia Romagna	Cured meats
Salami with lengual	Lombardy	Cured meats
Salato (cheese)	Friuli-Venezia Giulia	Cheeses and dairy products
Salina caper	Sicily	Vegetable preserves
Bianca di Saluzzo chicken	Piedmont	Chicken breed
Salva	Liguria	Cheeses and dairy products
Sambucana lamb	Piedmont	Sheep breeds
San Gavino Monreale saffron	Sardinia	Herbs and aromas
San Gregorio Magno soppressata	Campania	Cured meats
San Marzano tomato	Campania	Tomato variety
Sant'Agata dei Goti Annurca apple	Campania	Annurca historical Italian apple cultivar
Sant'Angelo di Brolo Salami	Sicily	Cured meats
Sant'Erasmo purple artichoke	Veneto	Vegetables
Santo Stefano di Sessanio Lentil	Abruzzo	Pulses
Santo Trentino wine	Trentino-Alto Adige/Südtirol	Wine
Saracena Moscato	Calabria	Wine
Saras del fen	Piedmont	Cheeses and dairy products
Sarconi bean	Basilicata	Pulses
Sardo-modicana cattle	Sardinia	Cattle breeds
Sasaka	Friuli-Venezia Giulia	Cured meats
Saviore valley Fatulì	Lombardy	Cheeses and dairy products
Savoiarda sheep	Piedmont	Sheep breed
Savona Chinotto sour orange	Liguria	Citrus variety
Savory honey	Abruzzo	Honeys
Scipiona pear	Emilia Romagna	Pear variety
Scuete Fumade	Friuli-Venezia Giulia	Cheeses and dairy products
Senise pepper	Basilicata	Pepper variety
Serra de'Conti Cicerchia	Marche	Pulses
Sfratto	Tuscany	Cakes and biscuits
Raviggiolo sheep	Tuscany	Cheeses and dairy products
Sibillini Mountains pink apple	Marche	Apple variety
Siena Buristo	Tuscany	Cured meats
Sila Soppressata	Calabria	Cured meats
Slattato	Marche	Cheeses and dairy products
Smoked horse meat	Trentino-Alto Adige/Südtirol	Cured meats
Smoked ricotta	Calabria	Cheeses and dairy products
Sole, Peio and Rabbi valleys Casolèt	Trentino-Alto Adige/Südtirol	Cheeses and dairy products
Sopravissana sheep	Abruzzo	Sheep breed
Sopravissana sheep pecorino	Abruzzo	Cheeses and dairy products
Sorana bean	Tuscany	Pulses
Sorrentino tomato	Campania	Tomato variety
Sorrento lemon	Campania	Lemon variety
Spadona pear	Emilia Romagna	Pears
Spalla cruda	Emilia Romagna	Cured meats
Spilinga Nduja	Calabria	Meat byproducts
Stilfser	Trentino-Alto Adige/Südtirol	Cheeses and dairy products
Stracchino	Lombardy	Cheeses and dairy products
Stracciata	Abruzzo	Cheeses and dairy products
Strachitund	Lombardy	Cheeses and dairy products
Susianella	Lazio	Cured meats
Tenera Ascoli olive	Marche	Vegetable preserves
Teresa apple	Liguria	Apple variety
Tergu salame	Sardinia	Cured meats
Testun	Piedmont	Cheeses and dairy products
Toma di Balme	Piedmont	Cheeses and dairy products
Toma di Elva	Piedmont	Cheeses and dairy products
Tombea	Lombardy	Cheeses and dairy products
Torbole broccoli	Trentino-Alto Adige/Südtirol	Vegetables
Toritto almond	Apulia	Nuts
Torriana grey apple	Piedmont	Apple variety
Tortona strawberry	Piedmont	Strawberries
Tortona Valley salami	Piedmont	Cured meats
Varzese Ottonese Tortonese cattle	Piedmont	Cattle breeds
Tosco-Romagnolo Apennine Raviggiolo	Emilia Romagna	Cheeses and dairy products
Traditional Alta Murgia bread	Apulia	Bread
Traditional Cetara anchovy extract	Campania	Preserved fish
Traditional Genepy from the Cuneo valleys	Piedmont	Spirits
Traditional marinated Comacchio Valleys eel	Emilia Romagna	Preserved fish
Trapani Artisan sea salt	Sicily	Herbs and aromas
Trentino Luganega	Trentino-Alto Adige/Südtirol	Cured meats
Trevi Black celery	Umbria	Vegetables
Triora Alpeggio cheese	Liguria	Cheeses and dairy products
Tuscan Sea palamita	Tuscany	Fish
Ur-Paarl	Trentino-Alto Adige/Südtirol	Bread
Ustica lentil	Sicily	Pulses
Val Borbera Fagiolane (bean)	Piedmont	Pulses
Val d'Ossola Mortadella	Piedmont	Cured meats
Val Vigezzo ham	Piedmont	Cured meats
Valchiavenna goat Violino	Lombardy	Cured meats
Valdarno chicken	Tuscany	Chicken
Valdarno tarese	Tuscany	Cured meats
Valfortorina sheep	Campania	Sheep breed
Valle Argentina formaggetta	Liguria	Cheeses and dairy products
Vallesana goat	Piedmont	Goat breed
Valli Valdesi Mustardela	Piedmont	Cured meats
Valtellina buckwheat	Lombardy	Grains/cereals
Valtorta Agrì	Lombardy	Cheeses and dairy products
Ventricina	Abruzzo	Cured meats
Verdello lemon	Sicily	Lemon variety
Verzaschese goat	Lombardy	Goat breed
Vessalico garlic	Liguria	Garlic variety
Vezzena	Trentino-Alto Adige/Südtirol	Cheeses and dairy products
Villalba lentil, Lenticchia di Villalba	Sicily	Pulses
Volpina pear	Emilia Romagna	Pear variety
White Pertosa artichokes	Campania	Vegetables
White watermelon mostarda	Lombardy	Preserves
Wild lavender honey	Sardinia	Honeys
Zambana asparagus	Trentino-Alto Adige/Südtirol	Vegetables
Zeri lamb	Tuscany	Breeds
Zeuca apple	Friuli-Venezia Giulia	Apple variety
Zibello Culatello	Emilia Romagna	Cured meats
Ziger or Zigerkäse	Trentino-Alto Adige/Südtirol	Cheeses and dairy products
Zolfino bean	Tuscany	Pulses
Cartucciaru melon (Melone cartucciaru)	Sicily	Fruit
Favignana tuna fish roe (Bottarga di Favignana)	Sicily	Preserved fish
Maletto strawberry (Fragola di Maletto)	Sicily	Fruit
Modicana cattle	Sicily	Breeds
Monviso Valle Bronda Ramassin (Ramassin del Monviso Valle Bronda)	Piedmont	Fruit
Sciacca and Ribera Wild Strawberry	Sicily	Fruit
Rose syrup (Sciroppo di rose)	Liguria	

=== In the United States ===
Ark of Taste Foods in the United States
Food	Nation	State/region	Food type
Alaskan Birch syrup	United States	Alaska	
Algonquin squash	United States	Northeastern US	Squash
American Bronze turkey	United States	Rhode Island	Turkey
American Buff Goose	United States		Goose
American Butternut	United States	Eastern US	Nuts
American Chestnut	United States	Northeastern US	Nuts
American Chinchilla	United States		Rabbit
American Native Pecan	United States	Southern US	Nuts
Greenthread tea	United States		Beverage
Shrub	United States		Beverage
New Orleans French bread	United States		Bread
Piki bread	United States		Bread
Creole cream cheese	United States	Louisiana	Cheeses and dairy products
Dry Monterey Jack Cheese	United States	California	Cheeses and dairy products
Bay scallop	United States	Eastern US	Fish and shellfish
Delaware Bay oyster	United States	Delaware	Fish and shellfish
Geoduck	United States		Fish and shellfish
Louisiana oyster	United States	Louisiana	Fish and shellfish
Marbled Chinook salmon	United States		Fish and shellfish
Olympia oyster	United States		Fish and shellfish
Wild catfish	United States		Fish and shellfish
Wild Gulf Coast shrimp	United States		Fish and shellfish
Reefnet Salmon Fishing Method	United States	Northern Puget Sound	Fish and shellfish
Lake Michigan Whitefish	United States		Fish and shellfish
Capitol Reef Apple	United States	Fruita, Utah	Apples
Granite Beauty	United States	New Hampshire	Apples
Harrison Cider Apple	United States	New Jersey	Apples
Hauer Pippin	United States	California	Apples
Newtown Pippin	United States	Queens, New York	Apples
Gravenstein	United States	Sebastopol, California	Apples
Sierra Beauty	United States	California	Apples
Blenheim Apricot	United States		Apricots
Fuerte avocado	United States		Avocados
Puebla avocado	United States		Avocados
Wilson Popenoe avocado	United States		Avocados
Black Republican cherry	United States		Cherries
Black Sphinx date	United States		Dates
Bronx grape	United States		Grapes
Meyer lemon	United States	Central Coast of California	Lemons
Hatcher mango	United States		Mangos
Pantin mamey sapote	United States		Sapote
Crane melon	United States		Fruit
California Mission olive	United States	California	Fruit
Inland Empire Old-Grove orange	United States		Fruit
Louisiana Satsuma	United States	Louisiana	Fruit
Pawpaw	United States	Eastern US	Fruit
Baby Crawford	United States		Peaches
Fay Elberta	United States		Peaches
Oldmixon Free	United States		Peaches
Rio Oso Gem	United States		Peaches
Silver Logan	United States		Peaches
Sun Crest peach	United States		Peaches
Burford pear	United States		Pears
American persimmon	United States		Persimmon
Japanese massaged dried persimmon (Hoshigaki)	United States	California	Persimmon
Elephant Heart plum	United States		Plums
Inca plum	United States		Plums
Laroda plum	United States		Plums
Mariposa plum	United States		Plums
Padre plum	United States		Plums
Meech's Prolific quince	United States		Quince
Klondike, Daybreak, Headliner, & Tangi strawberries	United States	Louisiana	Strawberry
Pixie tangerine	United States	Ojai Valley	Tangerine
Moon & Stars watermelon	United States		Watermelon
Yellow-Meated watermelon	United States		Watermelon
Chapalote corn	United States		Grains/cereals
Chicos (dried corn)	United States		Grains/cereals
Roy’s Calais Flint corn	United States		Grains/cereals
Tuscarora White corn	United States		Grains/cereals
Anishinaabeg wild rice (hand-harvested)	United States		Grains/cereals
Carolina Gold Rice	United States	South Carolina Lowcountry	Grains/cereals
Turkey hard red winter wheat	United States		Grains/cereals
White Sonora wheat	United States		Grains/cereals
Handmade Filé	United States		Herbs and spices
Alaea salt	United States	Hawaii	Herbs and spices
Desert/Mexican oregano (Lippia graveolens)	United States	Sonoran & Chihuahuan Deserts	Herbs and spices
American Plains Bison	United States		Cattle
Corriente cattle	United States		Cattle
Florida Cracker cattle	United States		Cattle
American Milking Devon	United States		Cattle
Pineywoods cattle	United States		Cattle
Randall cattle	United States		Cattle
Buckeye	United States		Chicken
Delaware	United States	Delaware	Chicken
Dominique chicken	United States		Chicken
Java	United States		Chicken
Jersey Giant chicken	United States		Chicken
New Hampshire chicken	United States		Chicken
Old Type Rhode Island Red	United States		Chicken
Plymouth Rock chicken	United States		Chicken
Wyandotte chicken	United States		Chicken
Cayuga Duck	United States		Ducks
Spanish goat	United States		Goats
Tennessee Myotonic goat	United States		Goats
American Pilgrim goose	United States		Goose
Cotton Patch Goose	United States		Goose
Guinea Hog	United States		Hog
Ossabaw Island Hog	United States		Hog
Mulefoot hog	United States		Hog
Red Wattle hog	United States		Hog
American rabbit	United States		Rabbit
Giant Chinchilla	United States		Rabbit
Silver fox rabbit	United States		Rabbit
Gulf Coast Native sheep	United States		Sheep
Navajo-Churro sheep	United States		Sheep
St. Croix sheep	United States		Sheep
Tunis sheep	United States		Sheep
Bourbon Red turkey	United States		Turkey
Jersey Buff turkey	United States		Turkey
Midget White turkey	United States		Turkey
Narragansett Turkey	United States		Turkey
Royal Palm	United States		Turkey
Slate	United States		Turkey
Daube Glacé	United States	New Orleans	Meat products
Hog’s head cheese	United States	Southern Louisiana	Meat products
Southern Louisiana Ponce	United States	Louisiana	Meat products
Traditional Tasso	United States	Southern Louisiana	Meat products
Emory Oak "Bellota" Acorn	United States		Nuts
Nevada Single Leaf Pinyon (pine nut)	United States		Nuts
Shagbark Hickory Nut	United States		Nuts
Kalo Poi Taro	United States	Hawaii	Prepared foods
Roman Taffy Candy	United States		Prepared foods
Arikara Yellow bean	United States		Pulses
Bolita bean	United States		Pulses
Brown Tepary bean	United States		Pulses
Cherokee Trail of Tears bean	United States		Pulses
Christmas Lima bean	United States		Pulses
Crowder Cowpeas (Mississippi Silver Hull bean)	United States		Pulses
Four Corners Gold bean	United States	Four Corners region	Pulses
Hidatsa Red bean	United States		Pulses
Hidatsa Shield Figure bean	United States		Pulses
Hopi Mottled Lima bean	United States		Pulses
Hutterite Soup bean	United States		Pulses
Jacob's Cattle bean	United States		Pulses
Lina Cisco’s Bird Egg bean	United States		Pulses
Marrowfat bean	United States		Pulses
Mayflower bean	United States		Pulses
Mesquite pod flour	United States		Pulses
O'odham pink bean	United States	Arizona	Pulses
Petaluma Gold Rush bean	United States	California	Pulses
Rio Zape bean	United States		Pulses
Santa Maria Pinquitos bean	United States		Pulses
Sea Island Red Pea	United States		Pulses
True Red Cranberry bean	United States		Pulses
Turkey Craw bean	United States		Pulses
White Tepary bean	United States		Pulses
Yellow Indian Woman bean	United States		Pulses
Early Blood Turnip-rooted beet	United States		Beets
Lorz Italian garlic	United States		Garlic
Inchelium Red garlic	United States		Garlic
Amish Deer Tongue lettuce	United States		Lettuce
Grandpa Admire's lettuce	United States		Lettuce
Speckled lettuce	United States		Lettuce
Tennis Ball lettuce (black seeded)	United States		Lettuce
I'itoi onion	United States		Onion
Beaver Dam pepper	United States	Wisconsin	Peppers
Bull Nose Large Bell pepper	United States		Peppers
Datil pepper	United States		Peppers
Fish pepper	United States		Peppers
Hinkelhatz Hot pepper	United States		Peppers
Jimmy Nardello's Sweet Italian Frying pepper	United States	Naugatuck, Connecticut	Peppers
New Mexico Native Chiles	United States	New Mexico	Peppers
Sheepnose pimiento	United States		Peppers
Wenk's Yellow Hot pepper	United States		Peppers
Chiltepin chile	United States		Peppers
Green Mountain potato	United States		Potato
Ozette potato	United States		Potato
White Cream sweet potato	United States		Potato
Amish Pie squash	United States		Squash
Boston Marrow squash	United States		Squash
Canada Crookneck squash	United States		Squash
Green-striped cushaw	United States		Squash
Sibley squash	United States		Squash
Amish Paste tomato	United States		Tomato
Aunt Molly's Husk tomato	United States		Tomato
Aunt Ruby's German Green	United States		Tomato
Burbank tomato	United States		Tomato
Chalk’s Early Jewel tomato	United States		Tomato
Cherokee Purple	United States		Tomato
Djena Lee’s Golden Girl tomato	United States		Tomato
German Pink tomato	United States		Tomato
Livingston’s Globe tomato	United States		Tomato
Livingston’s Golden Queen tomato	United States		Tomato
Orange Oxheart tomato	United States		Tomato
Radiator Charlie’s Mortgage Lifter tomato	United States	West Virginia	Tomato
Red Fig tomato	United States		Tomato
Sheboygan tomato	United States		Tomato
Sudduth Strain Brandywine tomato	United States		Tomato
Valencia tomato	United States		Tomato
New Mexico Native tomatillo	United States		Tomatillo
Gilfeather turnip	United States		Turnip
Wine Vinegar, Orleans Method	United States		Wines and vinegars
Charbono grape	United States	California	Wines and vinegars
Napa Gamay/Valdiquie grape	United States	California	Wines and vinegars
Norton grape	United States		Wines and vinegars
New England boiled cider and cider jelly	United States		
Gallberry honey	United States		Honeys
Guajillo honey	United States		Honeys
Mayhaw jelly and syrup	United States	Southern United States	
White Kiawe honey	United States	Hawaii	Honeys
Sourwood honey	United States		Honeys
Tupelo honey	United States		Honeys
Traditional cane syrup	United States		
Traditional sorghum syrup	United States		Other

=== Throughout the world ===
Ark of Taste Foods
Food	Nation	State/region	Food type
Abjosh Raisin of Herat	Afghanistan		Fruit
Araucaria pine nut	Argentina		Fruit
Capia corn	Argentina		Grains/cereals
Carob flour from white carob	Argentina		Pulses
Criollo White Corn	Argentina		Grains/cereals
Quebrada de Humahuaca (Andean potatoes)	Argentina		Potatoes
Yacón	Argentina		Vegetable
Yellow Socorro corn	Argentina		Grains/cereals
Motal cheese	Armenia		Cheeses and dairy products
Angasi Oyster	Australia		Seafood
Australian Native Raspberries	Australia		Fruit, nuts and fruit preserves
Bimbala	Australia		Fish
Blacklip Abalone	Australia		Seafood
Bogong moth	Australia		Insects
Bull Boar sausage	Australia		Cured meats
Bunya nuts	Australia	Queensland	Fruit
bush banana (Marsdenia australis)	Australia		Fruit
Bush Bean	Australia		Vegetables
Bush coconut	Australia		Insects
Bush Onion	Australia		Vegetables
Bush Potato	Australia		Vegetables
Bush Tomato	Australia		Vegetables
Central Australian Wild Plum	Australia		Fruits
Cole's Wattle	Australia		Fruits
cumbungi or bulrush (Typha Orientalis, Typha Domingensis	Australia		Vegetables
Ligurian bee honey	Australia	Kangaroo Island	Honeys
Leatherwood honey	Australia		Honeys
Abgereifter	Austria		Cheeses and dairy products
Bregenzerwälder Mountain cheese	Austria		Cheeses and dairy products
Carinzian Speck	Austria		Meat by-products
Wachauer Safran (Crocus austriacus)	Austria		Herbs and aromas
Forest sheep	Austria		Sheep
Giants of Aspern	Austria		Vegetables
Krainer Steinschaf	Austria		Breeds
Lungauer Rahmkoch	Austria		Cakes and biscuits
Lungauer Tauernroggen	Austria		Grains/cereals
Sulmtaler chicken	Austria		Chicken
Talggen	Austria		Oven-baked products
Vineyard Garlic	Austria		Garlic
Vineyard peach	Austria		Peaches
Vorarlberger Riebelmais	Austria		Grains/cereals
Waldviertler Blond	Austria		Breeds
Pozegaka Plum Slatko	Bosnia and Herzegovina		Preserves
Sack Cheese	Brazil		Cheeses and dairy products
Aratu	Brazil		Crustacean
Babaçu	Brazil		Fruits
Baru nut	Brazil		Fruits
Canapu Cowpea	Brazil		Vegetables
Canudo nectar of the Sateré Mawé	Brazil		Honeys
Juçara Palm Heart	Brazil		Vegetables
Marmelada de Santa Luzia	Brazil		Vegetable preserves
Montenegro Tangerine	Brazil		Tangerines
Native Guaraná of Sateré Mawé	Brazil		Fruits
Pirarucu	Brazil		Fish
Red Rice or Venice Rice	Brazil		Grains/cereals
Serra Catarinense Araucaria Nut	Brazil		Fruits
Sweet potato flour	Brazil		Vegetables
Umbu	Brazil		Fruits
Canadienne Cow	Canada		Breeds
Chanteclair chicken	Canada		Chicken
Herring Spawn on Kelp	Canada		Fish
Miner's lettuce (Montia Perfoliata)	Canada	Southwestern British Columbia	Vegetables
Montreal melon	Canada		Fruits
Nodding onion (allium cernuum)	Canada		Vegetables
Nova Scotia Gravenstein Apple	Canada		Apples
Red Fife wheat	Canada		Grains/cereals
Saskatoon berry (Amelanchier alnifolia)	Canada		Fruits
Great Plains bison	Canada		Breeds
Blue egg chicken	Chile		Chicken
Calbuco Black-Bordered oyster	Chile		Fish
Merquèn	Chile		Herbs and aromas
White strawberry	Chile	Purén	Strawberries
Robinson Crusoe Island Seafood	Chile	Robinson Crusoe & Alejandro Selkirk Islands	Fish
Giant Istrian Ox	Croatia		Breeds
Ljubitovica Garlic	Croatia		Garlic
Halloumi	Cyprus		Cheeses and dairy products
Pastelli	Cyprus		Cakes and biscuits
Tsamarella	Cyprus		Meat by-products
Salted Artisan Butter	Denmark		Dairy products
Nacional cacao	Ecuador		Coffees, teas and cacaos
Siwa Date	Egypt		Fruits
Kalakukko	Finland		Breads
Baréges Gavarnie Sheep	France		Sheep
Bigorre Gascony Black Pig	France		Breeds
Blonde peas from the Planèze	France		Pulses
Breton Pie Noire (Cow Breed)	France		Breeds
Bruis walnut	France	Upper Valley of Oule	Fruits
Haute Provence Einkorn	France		Grains/cereals
Maine-Anjou (Cow Breed)	France		Breeds
Pardailhan black turnip	France		Vegetables
Brigasque sheep	France		Breeds
Pelardon affiné	France		Cheeses and dairy products
Planèze de Saint Flour blonde lentil	France		Pulses
Planèze de Saint-Flour golden lentil	France		Pulses
Rennes Coucou Chicken	France		Chicken
Roussane de Monein peach	France		Peaches
Dry Rancios wine	France	Roussillon	Wines
Rove Brousse goat cheese	France		Cheeses and dairy products
Sagarnoa	France		Alcoholic drinks
Sarteau pear	France		Pears
Trébons onion	France		Onions
Cuvée des vignes d'antan	France		Wines
Alb-Leisa	Germany		Lentils
Bamberger Hörnla	Germany		Potatoes
Champagner Bratbirne Pear Spumante	Germany		Alcoholic drinks
Diepholzer Moorschnucke	Germany		Breeds
Early Pinot Noir	Germany		Wines
Filder Pointed Cabbage	Germany		Vegetables
Höri peninsula onion	Germany		Onions
Limpurg Pasture oxen	Germany		Breeds
Murnau-Werdenfelser cow	Germany		Breeds
Musmehl & Brenntar	Germany		Flour, porridge
Northern Assia Ahle Wurscht	Germany		Cured meats
Ostheimer Baked Pork Terrina with Liver	Germany		Meat by-products
Piebald Bentheim pig	Germany		Breeds
Rhön sheep	Germany		Sheep
Swabian Alb snail	Germany		Breeds
Teltow turnip	Germany		Vegetables
Würchwitzer mite cheese	Germany		Cheeses and dairy products
Mavrotragano	Greece		Wines
Niotiko	Greece		Cheeses and dairy products
Xinotiri of Naxos	Greece		Cheeses and dairy products
Huehuetenango Highland Coffee	Guatemala		Coffee, tea and cacao
Ixcàn cardamom	Guatemala		Herbs and aromas
Mangalica Sausage	Hungary		Cured meats
Icelandic goat	Iceland		Goats
Skyr	Iceland		Cheeses and dairy products
Derhadun Basmati Rice	India		Grains/cereals
Ross nonpareil apple	Ireland		Fruits, nuts and fruit preserves
Kerry cattle	Ireland	Kerry	Breeds and animal husbandry
Irish peach apple	Ireland, England	Sligo, Sud Est	Fruits, nuts and fruit preserves
Irish Moiled	Ireland	Cavan, Monaghan	Breeds and animal husbandry
Fresh blood pudding	Ireland	Kerry	Cured meats and meat products
Dillisk	Ireland	Sligo	Spices, wild herbs, and condiments
Carrageen	Ireland	Galway	Algae
Blaa	Ireland	Waterford	Bread and baked goods
Ard Cairn russet	Ireland	Cork	Fruit, nuts, and fruit preserves
Sneem black pudding	Ireland	Kerry	Cured meats and meat products
Irish Raw Cow's Milk Cheese	Ireland		Cheeses and dairy products
Irish Wild Smoked Salmon	Ireland		Fish
Stone Ground Irish Oatmeal	Ireland	Macroom, County Cork	Cereals and flours
Amarume welsh onion	Japan		Onions
Akanegi	Japan		Onions
Akkajidaikon	Japan		Vegetables
Dojo Hachiyagaki (dried persimmon)	Japan		Fruit
Hachiretsu corn	Japan		Grains/cereals
Hanazukuri daikon	Japan		Vegetables
Kiso red turnip	Japan		Vegetables
Kozena daikon	Japan		Vegetables
Masakari Kabocha	Japan		Vegetables
Mizukakena (nouguchina)	Japan		Vegetables
Nare-zushi made with mackerel	Japan		Preserved fish
Roasted and smoked goby from Nagatsura bay	Japan		Fish
Salted Etari anchovies	Japan		Preserved fish
Sapporokii onion	Japan		Onions
Shottsuru made with hatahata from the Gulf of Akita	Japan		Preserved fish
Tankaku cow	Japan		Breeds
Tojinna - Nagasaki Cabbage	Japan		Vegetables
Unzen Kobutakana	Japan		Vegetables
Yatabenegi Yatabe Welsh onion	Japan		Fruit
Yukina (Kabunotou)	Japan		Vegetables
Zazamushi	Japan		Breeds
Gegeol radish	Korea		Vegetables
Jāņu siers	Latvia		Cheeses and dairy products
Andasibe red rice	Madagascar		Grains/cereals
Mananara vanilla	Madagascar		Herbs and aromas
Bario rice	Malaysia		Grains/cereals
Rimbas black pepper	Malaysia		Herbs and aromas
Dogon shallot	Mali		Vegetables
Imraguen Women's Mullet Bottarga	Mauritania		Preserved fish
Chinantla vanilla	Mexico		Herbs and aromas
Seri fire-roasted mesquite	Mexico		Grains/cereals
Tehuacàn amaranth	Mexico		Grains/cereals
Argan oil	Morocco		Seed oil
Amsterdam Osseworst	Netherlands		Cured meats
Chaam Capon	Netherlands		Breeds
Drenthe Heath sheep	Netherlands		Sheep
Friesian smoked sausage	Netherlands		Cured meats
Kempen Heath sheep	Netherlands		Breeds
Leiden butter and Leiden buttermilk	Netherlands		Cheeses and dairy products
Original Schiedam Malt Gin	Netherlands		Alcoholic drink
Angelica Vossakvann	Norway		Herbs and aromas
Artisan Sognefjord Geitost	Norway		Cheeses and dairy products
Baccala from Møre og Romsdal	Norway		Preserved fish
Cured and Smoked Herring from Sunnmøre	Norway		Fish
Garden pea Jærert	Norway		Pulses
Stockfish from the Isle of Sørøya	Norway		Fish
Turnip Målselvnepe	Norway		Vegetables
Villsau sheep	Norway		Sheep
Andean kañihua	Peru		Herbs and aromas
Pampacorral sweet potato	Peru		Potatoes
San Marcos Andean Fruit (Tomatillo, Poro Poro, and Pushgay)	Peru		Fruit
Traditional chuño blanco	Peru		Vegetables
Adlay	Philippines		Cereals and flours
Alupag tree	Philippines		Fruit, nuts and fruit preserves
Asín tibuok sea salt	Philippines		Salt
Ayusip berry	Philippines		Fruit, nuts and fruit preserves
Barako coffee	Philippines		Coffee
Batuan	Philippines		Fruit, nuts and fruit preserves
Batwan	Philippines		Fruit, nuts and fruit preserves
Baya rice wine	Philippines		Distilled and fermented beverages
Benguet coffee	Philippines		Coffee
Bohol ubi kinampay, purple yam	Philippines		Vegetables and vegetable preserves
Budbud kabog	Philippines		Cakes and biscuits
Burnt corn flour (corn coffee)	Philippines		Cereals and flours
Cebu cinnamon	Philippines		Herbs and spices
Chong-ak rice	Philippines		Cereals and flours
Criollo cacao	Philippines		Cacao
Cordillera native black pig	Philippines		Breeds and animal husbandry
Darag chicken	Philippines		Breeds and animal husbandry
Dried spinefoot	Philippines		Fish, sea food and fish products
Duman	Philippines		Cereals and flours
Guso native seaweed	Philippines		Algae
Himbabao	Philippines		Vegetables and vegetable preserves
Imbuucan rice	Philippines		Cereals and flours
Inartem balayang (pickled wild banana)	Philippines		Vegetables and vegetable preserves
Ingudpur rice	Philippines		Cereals and flours
Jeykot sticky rice	Philippines		Cereals and flours
Kadyos	Philippines		Legumes
Kamatis Tagalog	Philippines		Vegetables and vegetable preserves
Kamias	Philippines		Fruit, nuts and fruit preserves
Katmon	Philippines		Fruit, nuts and fruit preserves
Kiniing	Philippines		Cured meats and meat products
Kundadit	Philippines		Cakes, pastries and sweets
Kunsilba (Banana Brittle)	Philippines		Cakes, pastries and sweets
Lagundi	Philippines		Spices, wild herbs and condiments
Landang	Philippines		Cereals and flours
Lingaro berry	Philippines		Fruit, nuts and fruit preserves
Luyang dilaw or Conig wild ginger	Philippines		Tea, Vegetables
Ominio rice	Philippines		Cereals and flours
Pajo mango	Philippines		Fruit, nuts and fruit preserves
Marang	Philippines		Fruit, nuts and fruit preserves
Miaray (Citrus miaray)	Philippines		Fruit, nuts and fruit preserves
Nipa vinegar (sukang nipa)	Philippines		Vinegar
Paroakan chicken	Philippines		Breeds and animal husbandry
Philippine mouse-deer	Philippines		Breeds and animal husbandry
Pili	Philippines		Fruit, nuts and fruit preserves
Red rice from Kalinga and Ifugao (ulikan, mini-angan)	Philippines		Cereals and flours
Saging mondo banana	Philippines		Fruit, nuts and fruit preserves
Siling labuyo	Philippines		Herbs and spices
Sinarapan	Philippines		Fish, sea food and fish products
Sulu robusta coffee	Philippines		Coffee
Sulu zibet coffee (kahawa kubing)	Philippines		Coffee
Tabo	Philippines		Fruit, nuts and fruit preserves
Tabon-tabon	Philippines		Fruit, nuts and fruit preserves
Tamaraw	Philippines		Breeds and animal husbandry
Tamilok	Philippines		Fish, sea food and fish products
Tawilis (Sardinella tawilis)	Philippines		Fish
Tinigib Visayan White Corn	Philippines		Cereals and flours
Tisa	Philippines		Fruit, nuts and fruit preserves
Tubho tea	Philippines		Tea and infusions
Visayan spotted deer	Philippines		Breeds and animal husbandry
Visayan warty pig	Philippines		Breeds and animal husbandry
Yellow cattle	Philippines		Cattle
Oscypek	Poland		Cheeses and dairy products
Polish Mead	Poland		Alcoholic drink
Azaruja sausages	Portugal	Azaruja, Évora, Alentejo	Cured meats
Broa de Avintes	Portugal		Bread
Cachena da Peneda Cattle (Cachena Cattle)	Portugal		Cattle breed
Churra Algarvia Sheep	Portugal		Breeds
Ermelo's Orange	Portugal		Fruit
Mirandesa Sausage	Portugal	Miranda do Douro, Alto Trás-os-Montes, Norte Region	Cured meats
Queijo Serra da Estrela (PDO)	Portugal	Serra da Estrela, Centro Region	Cheeses and dairy products
Scorzonera sweet	Portugal	Évora, Alentejo	Cakes and biscuits
Serpa cheese (PDO)	Portugal	Serpa, Alentejo	Cheeses and dairy products
Tarreste bean of Serra do Soajo and Serra da Peneda	Portugal		Vegetables
Transmontano Goat's Cheese (PDO)	Portugal	Alto Trás-os-Montes, Norte Region	Cheeses and dairy products
Brânzá de Burduf	Romania		Cheeses and dairy products
Tuva cheeses	Russian Federation		Cheeses and dairy products
Yurlov rich-voiced chicken	Russian Federation		Chicken
Bryndza	Slovakia (Slovak Republic)		Cheeses and dairy products
Tolminc	Slovenia		Cheeses and dairy products
Natural cider from selected apples	Spain		Must and wine-based drinks
Aceite de las Sierras Espadán y Calderona	Spain		Olive oil
Alavesa Mountain colt meat	Spain		Breeds
Aloreña Olive of Malaga	Spain		Fruit
Aragon 03 wheat, triticum aestivum, seed of soft wheat	Spain		Grains/cereals
Aritxabaltako moskorra	Spain		Vegetables
Asturian Escanda (Spelt wheat)	Spain		Grains/cereals
Atzebib, Denia Raisin (Sun raisin)	Spain		Fruit
Azpi Gorri goat	Spain		Goats
Alcaparra de Ballobar (Ballobar Caper)	Spain		Vegetables
Basque Autumn Green Leek	Spain		Vegetables
Betizu	Spain		Breeds
Black bread from Xeixa flour	Spain		Bread
Brotons and Espigalls	Spain		Vegetables
Carranzana Sheep cheese	Spain		Cheeses and dairy products
Cheese made with raw Guirra sheep's milk	Spain		Cheeses and dairy products
Crespiello or Vidadillo wine	Spain		Wines
Cuarentena tomato	Spain		Tomatoes
Derio Dwarf chard	Spain		Vegetables
Dry Rute anise	Spain		Alcoholic drink
Esperiega apple	Spain		Apples
Espichá (dry reedbed anchovy)	Spain		Fish
Euskal Antzara	Spain		Breeds
Euskal oiloa	Spain		Breeds
Euskal Txerria pig	Spain		Pigs
Extravirgin olive oil from ancient Maestrat olives	Spain		Olive oil
Fine Monquelin onion	Spain		Onions
Formentera's dried fish	Spain		Fish
Fresh bean or green bean	Spain		Vegetables
Ganxet beans	Spain		Vegetables
Gipuzkoan Coastal Tear pea	Spain		Pulses
Gorbea potato	Spain		Potatoes
Guardamar del Segura Ñora	Spain		Vegetable preserves
Guirra or Red Levantine Sheep	Spain		Breeds
Ice salt (Sal de hielo)	Spain		Herbs and aromas
Jiloca saffron	Spain		Herbs and aromas
Menorquina cow cheese	Spain		Cheeses and dairy products
Millo Corvo	Spain		Grains/cereals
Montmesa Camomile	Spain		Herbs and aromas
Mungiako taloa (flour used to prepare talo)	Spain		Bread
Necklace peanut (Cacau del Collaret)	Spain		Fruit
Paperina savoy cabbage	Spain		Vegetables
Penedès chicken	Spain		Chicken
Perrequeta endive	Spain		Vegetables
Pink tomato (Tomate Rosado)	Spain		Tomatoes
Preserved Cantabrian anchovies	Spain		Preserved fish
Preserved Tuna and Almadraba Roe	Spain		Fish
Purple carrot	Spain		Vegetables
Purple tomato	Spain	Rincón de Ademuz	Tomatoes
Red Majorcan sheep's cheese	Spain		Cheeses and dairy products
Ronda pear	Spain		Pears
Salt of Salinas de Añana	Spain		Herbs and spices
Sierra Nevada Mountain Potato Copo de Nieve	Spain		Potatoes
Sitges Malvasia	Spain		Wines
Smoked blue fish	Spain		Fish
Spider Crab, Lira Centollo	Spain		Fish
Urezti (late harvest)	Spain		Wines
Xalda sheep	Spain		Sheep
Yellow tendral melon	Spain	Quatretonda dry lands	Fruit
Zalla broad bean	Spain		Pulses
Zalla Violet onion	Spain		Onions
Astacus astacus	Sweden		Fish
Upplandskubb bread	Sweden		Bread
Brown beans	Sweden	Öland island	Pulses
Cellar-matured goat cheese (white goats cheese)	Sweden	Jämtland, Härjedalen	Cheeses and dairy products
Linderöd pig	Sweden		Pigs
Reindeer souvas	Sweden		Meat by-products
Berudge Eau-de-vie	Switzerland		Spirits
Bona flour	Switzerland		Grains/cereals
Buttemoscht	Switzerland		Vegetable preserves
Carnival ravioli	Switzerland		Cakes and biscuits
Chriesimues	Switzerland	Wimmis	Preserves
Fidighèla	Switzerland		Cured meats
Hay-packed Cheese	Switzerland		Cheeses and dairy products
Honey from the Swiss Landrassen Bee	Switzerland		Honeys
Pinot noir	Switzerland	Servagnin	Wines
Rye bread	Switzerland	Val Müstair	Bread
Sac	Switzerland		Cured meats
Spampezi	Switzerland		Cakes and biscuits
Taillè with chitlins	Switzerland		Oven-baked products
Traditional Kirsch	Switzerland		Alcoholic drink
Traditional Valais rye bread	Switzerland		Bread
Zincarlin	Switzerland		Cheeses and dairy products
Djulis	Taiwan		Grains/cereals
Tarama (also known as Haviar)	Turkey		Cured mullet roe
Grey Ukrainian cow	Ukraine		Breeds
Aylesbury Prune	United Kingdom		fruit
Artisan Cheddar cheese	United Kingdom	Somerset	Cheeses and dairy products
Bere meal	United Kingdom		Grains/cereals
British red grouse (Lagopus lagopus scotica)	United Kingdom		Breeds
Colchester Native Oysters	United Kingdom		Oysters
Dorset Blue Vinney	United Kingdom		Cheeses and dairy products
Double-Curd Lancashire	United Kingdom		Cheeses and dairy products
Fal Oysters	United Kingdom		Oysters
Formby Asparagus	United Kingdom		Vegetables
Gloucester cheese	United Kingdom		Cheeses and dairy products
Herefordshire Beefing Apple	United Kingdom		fruit
Herdwick sheep	United Kingdom		Sheep
Jersey Black Butter	United Kingdom		Preserves
Jersey Royal potato	United Kingdom		Potatoes
Kentish Cobnuts/Lambert's Filbert (Corylus maxima)	United Kingdom		Nuts
Manx Loaghtan lamb	Crown dependencies	Isle of Man & Jersey	Breeds
Medlar	United Kingdom		Fruit
Morecambe Bay Shrimp	United Kingdom		Fish
Old Gloucester Beef	United Kingdom		Breeds
Green ormer (Haliotis tuberculata)	United Kingdom		Fish
Pershore plum (Prunus domestica)	United Kingdom		Fruit
Portland Sheep	United Kingdom		Sheep
Somerset Cider Brandy	United Kingdom		Spirits
Three Counties Perry	United Kingdom		Alcoholic drink
Windermere Char	United Kingdom		Fish
Barlovento cacao	Venezuela		Coffee, tea and cacao

== See also ==
- Biodiversity
- Heirloom plant
- Local food
- List of food origins
- Rare breed (agriculture)
- Slow Food

== Similar organizations ==
- The Livestock Conservancy
- Rare Breeds Survival Trust
