= Mad sausage =

Italian sausage

Mad sausage (Italian: salsiccia matta; also ciavàr) is an Italian sausage made from pig offal and other parts, including tongue, cheek, heart and head. It is typical on the Romagna side of the Apennines. It is a traditional product of those living in the Romagnolo valleys, including Bagno di Romagna, San Piero in Bagno, and Santa Sofia. It is also eaten in Forlì, Cesena, Rimini and other areas of Romagna. Dark in color, it is made with salt, pepper, garlic and Sangiovese wine. It is eaten year-round grilled or cooked in the oven and sometimes preserved in oil (if made with less perishable pig parts). It is listed on the Ark of Taste.
