= Macroom Oatmeal =

Irish oat product

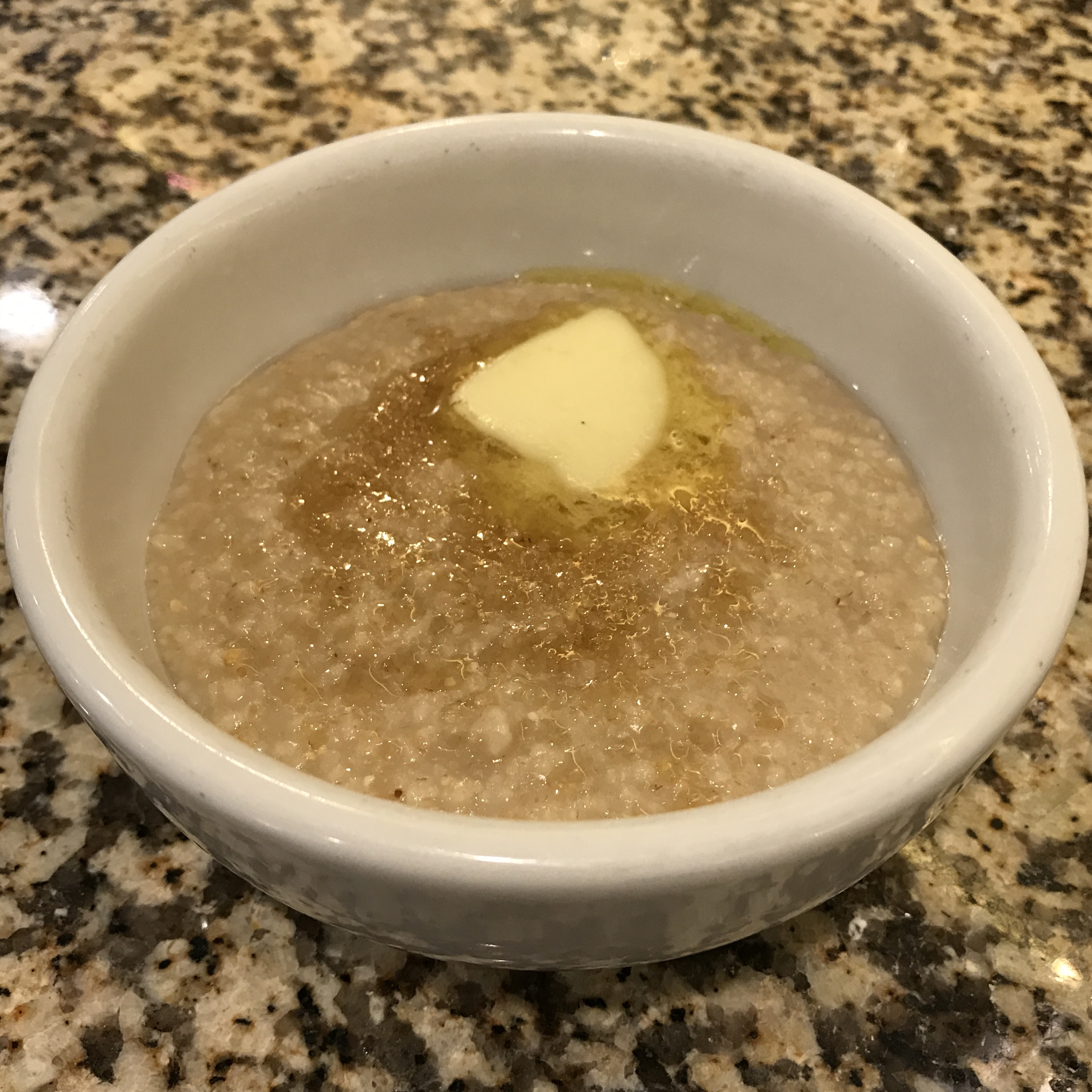
- Macroom oatmeal porridge, topped with muscovado sugar and butter
- Course: Breakfast
- Place of origin: Ireland
- Associated cuisine: Irish
- Serving temperature: Hot
- Main ingredients: Stone-ground oats

Macroom Oatmeal is a traditional stone-ground Irish oatmeal produced in Macroom, County Cork, Ireland, at Walton's Mill, the last surviving stone mill in Ireland. Slow Food selected it as the exemplar of stone ground Irish oatmeal, which was included in its Ark of Taste in 2011.

== History ==
The mill has been operated continuously by the same family since the 1700s. Donal Creedon, great-great-great-great-grandson of founder Richard Walton, now operates the mill. Michelin star-winning chef Myrtle Allen developed the Macroom Biscuit recipe which appears on the package.

== Production method ==
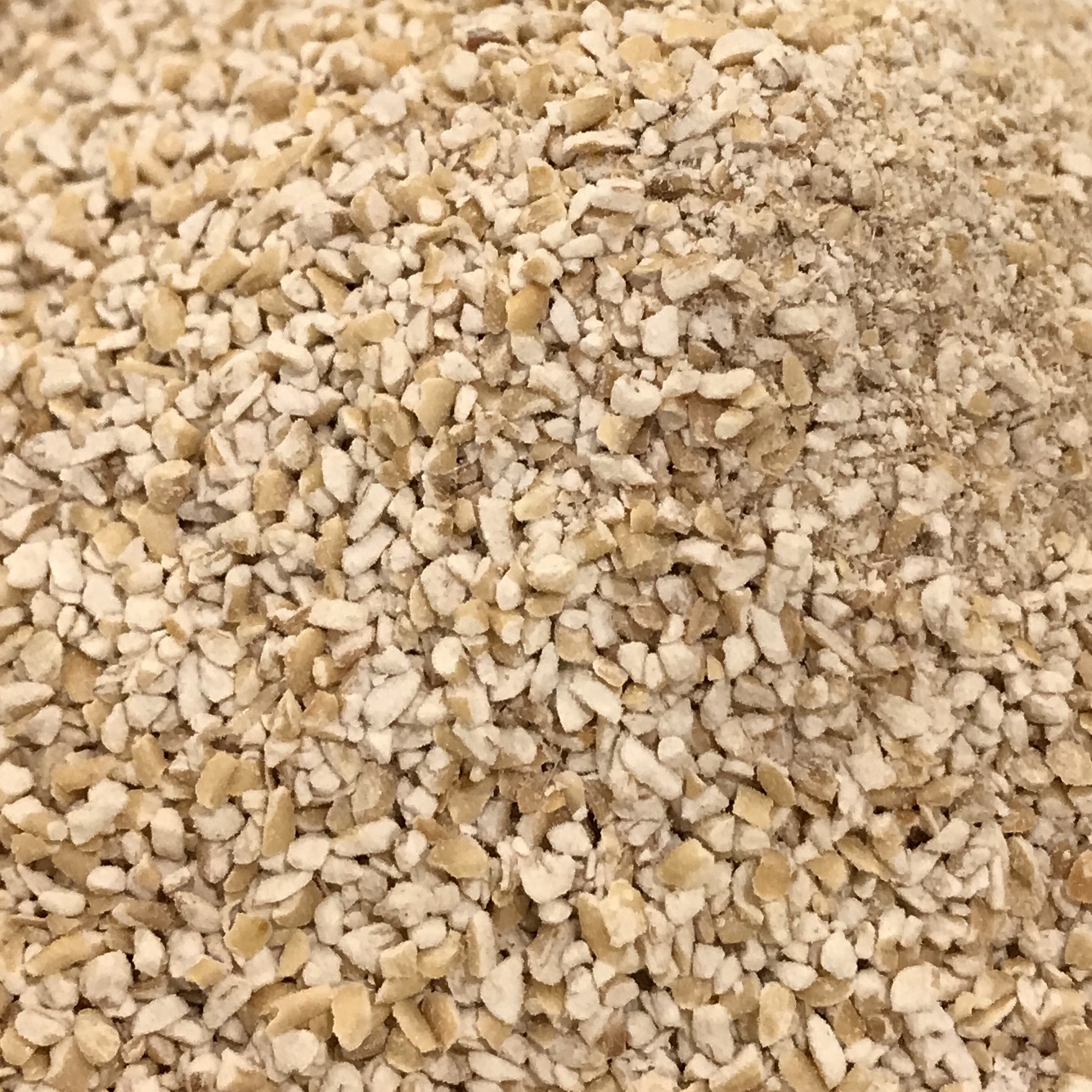
Closeup of uncooked Macroom oatmeal

Macroom oatmeal is stone-ground, then kiln-toasted.

== Reception ==
Saveur called it "different from anyone else's in Ireland, full of flavor when simply cooked and immensely satisfying in its grainy texture." Food writer John Thorne said it "may well be the best oatmeal I've ever eaten." Fodor's Ireland mentions Macroom Oatmeal. Darina Allen of Ballymaloe House, where Macroom Oatmeal is served for breakfast, said that Macroom Oatmeal has "a cult following both at home and abroad." James Beard 2010 Cookbook of the Year The Country Cooking of Ireland says "(t)he best oatmeal for Stirabout...is Macroom, milled by Donal Creedon in the town of that name in County Cork."
