= Upplandskubb =

Type of traditional Swedish bread

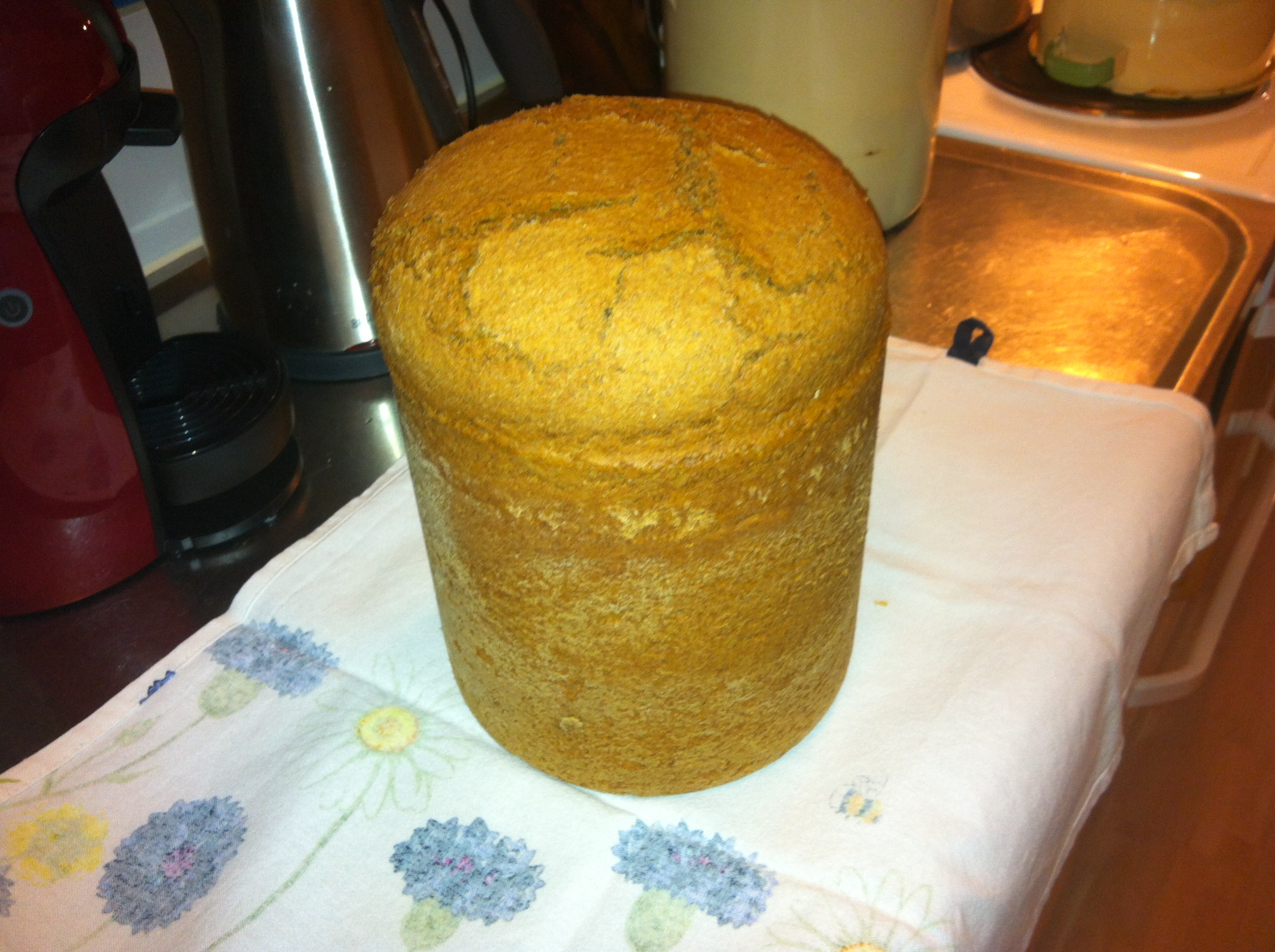

Upplandskubb is a Protected Designation of Origin and Ark of Taste bread traditionally produced in the province of Uppland in Sweden. It requires long fermentation and long baking in a bain-marie. It is often served at Christmas time.

== History ==
Upplandskubb is traditionally produced in the province of Uppland in Sweden.

Oldest known recipes date to the 19th century from Älgesta farm in Husby-Ärlinghundra parish. Although a traditional food, the bread did not receive the Upplandskubb name until sometime in the 1920s when a Stockholm woman, Elisabet Langenberg, came across it and became interested.

== Preparation ==
The bread is traditionally made from rye and wheat flours. The dough is typically fermented for three hours or more and baked for over four hours. The bread is unique in Sweden as it is baked by being boiled in a bain-marie, which keeps it from forming a crust; no other boiled bread is known in Sweden.

The bread is then to be left to sit after baking for at least a day and then cut, making it savory and rich. The finished product is moist and sticky with a small crumb and a crumbly texture. Flavors are sweet and sour rye.

== Serving ==
It is cut into four vertical pieces which are cut crosswise into quarter-circle slices. The bread is typically served with cured herring, lard or onion. It is commonly served at Christmastime. The bread keeps well.

== Protected Designation of Origin and Ark of Taste ==
This bread was registered for a Protected Designation of Origin designation in the European Union in 2014; the designation was granted in 2021. The designation requires the dough to be made of locally-produced flours. It has been taken on board the Ark of Taste by Slow Food.
