= Annurca =

Apple cultivar

'Annurca'
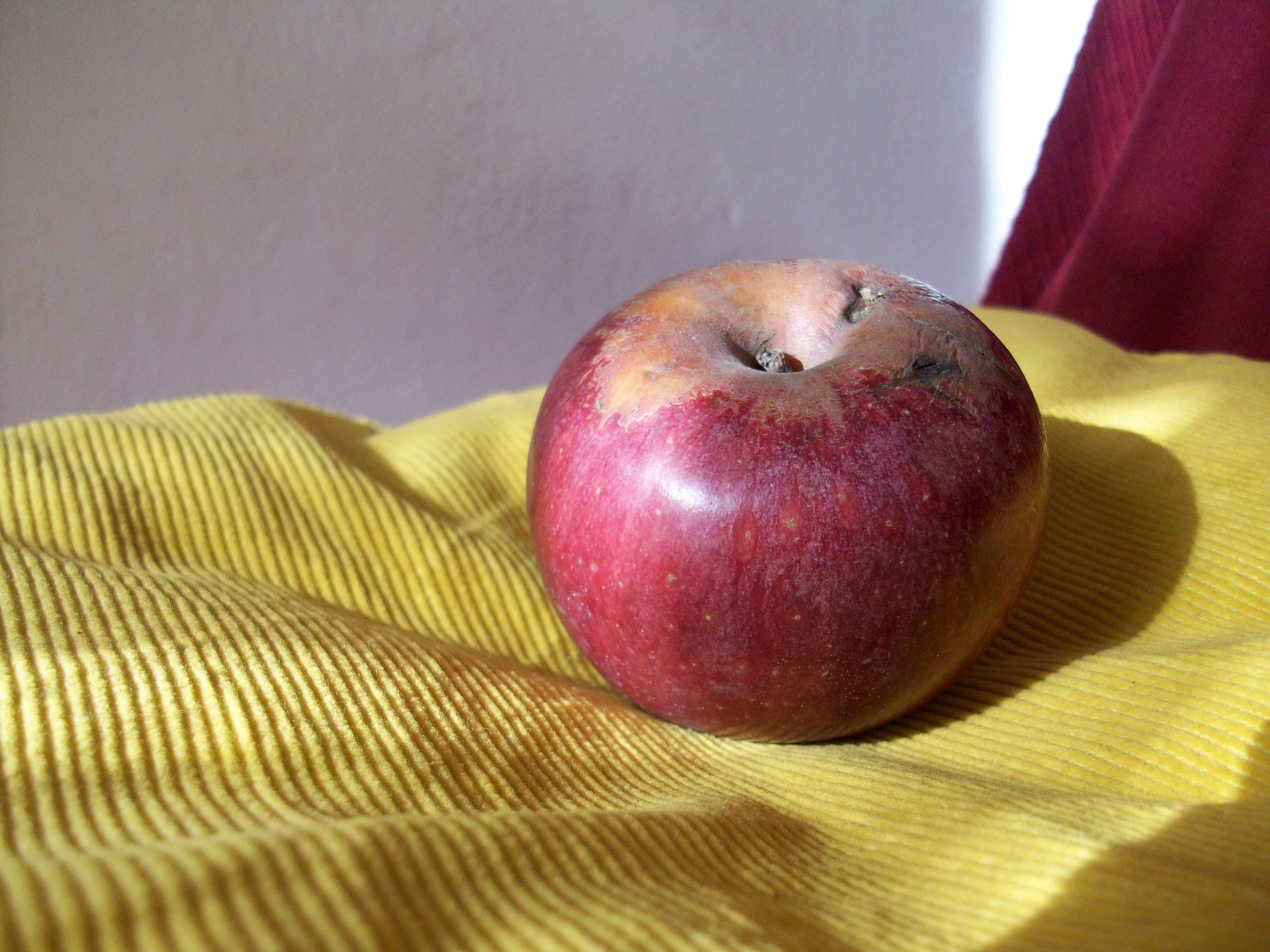
- Genus: Malus
- Species: Malus pumila
- Cultivar: 'Annurca'
- Origin: Italy

Annurca, pronounced in Italy [anˈnurka], also called Anurka, is a historically old cultivar of domesticated apple native to Southern Italy. It is believed to be the one mentioned by Pliny the Elder in his Naturalis Historia, and in the 16th century by Gian Battista della Porta. However it was first mentioned by this name by Giuseppe Antonio Pasquale.

Still today it is abundantly cultivated in Southern Italy, typically at the border between the Caserta and Benevento provinces, in the valley which is called the "queen of apples".

== At excavations ==
'Annurca' is one of the symbols of Campania presumably at least since two millennia ago, as showed by the fresco paintings in the Ercolano excavations, a Roman city which was destroyed by the Eruption of Mount Vesuvius in 79, especially at the Casa dei Cervi. It is believed that this apple is the one depicted at the ruins of Pompeii.

== Description ==
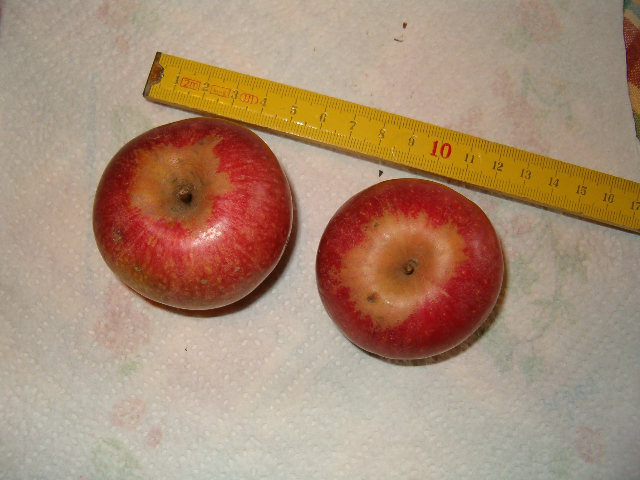

'Annurca' has a white pulp, firm and crunchy, a sweet aroma, and a pleasantly acidic taste. The apple doesn't ripen on the tree, but is carefully placed in the sun after it is picked until it turns red. However, it is still notable for its characteristic flavor and high firmness, linked to its high concentration of pectin, which changes its composition during the reddening process.

There are two selected clones of 'Annurca', Standard and Rossa del Sud ("Red of the South").

== Specialties ==
This cultivar is a very important fruit in the Neapolitan cuisine, is listed on the Ark of Taste as a unique local cultural and traditional slow food, and enjoy Protected Geographical Indication status within the European Union under the label "PGI Melannurca".
