= Casizolu =

Italian cheese

Casizolu is a cow's milk cheese from the Sardinia region of Italy, made by the pasta filata method. It is listed in the Ark of Taste.
