= Queijo de Cabra Transmontano =

Portuguese cheese

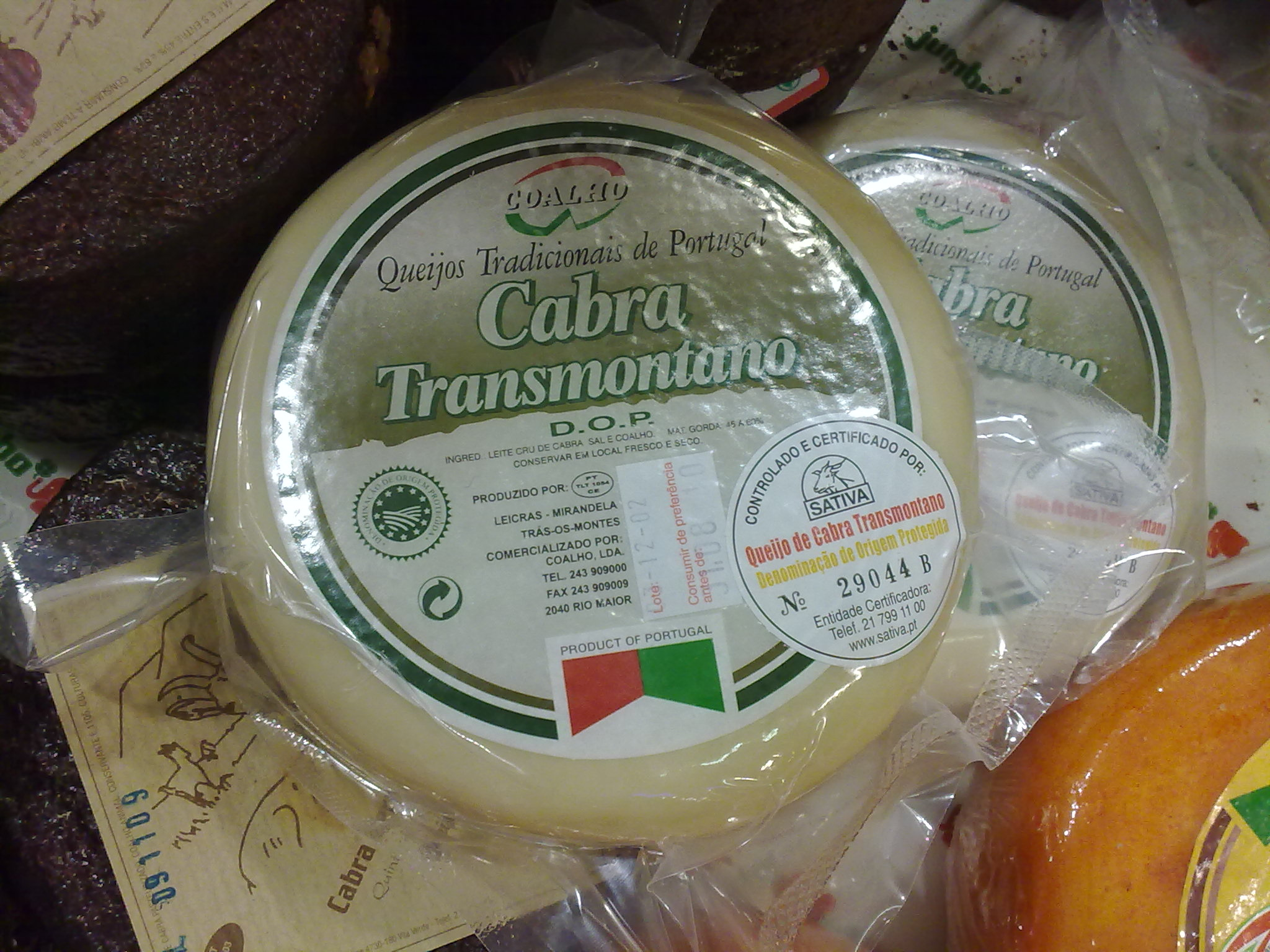
Queijo de Cabra Transmontano

Queijo de Cabra Transmontano (Transmontano Goat's Cheese) is a type of cheese made from goat milk (goat cheese) from Alto Trás-os-Montes, Norte Region, Portugal. It has a Protected designation of origin (PDO) and is listed on the Ark of Taste.
