= Serpa cheese =

Portuguese cheese

Serpa cheese (Queijo Serpa PDO) is a type of cheese from Serpa, Alentejo, Portugal. It has a Protected designation of origin (PDO) and is listed on the Ark of Taste.

Serpa cheese

Queijo Serpa is a cured, semi-soft cheese made with raw sheep milk and extracts of Cardoon (Cynara cardunculus L.) as coagulant. According to a traditional manufacturing process, no Fermentation starter culture added and pasteurization is not used.

Some aspects of the traditional manufacturing process are rooted in religious beliefs such as the Muslin used to filter the curd being folded exactly forty times.
