= Crane Melon =

Melon cultivar

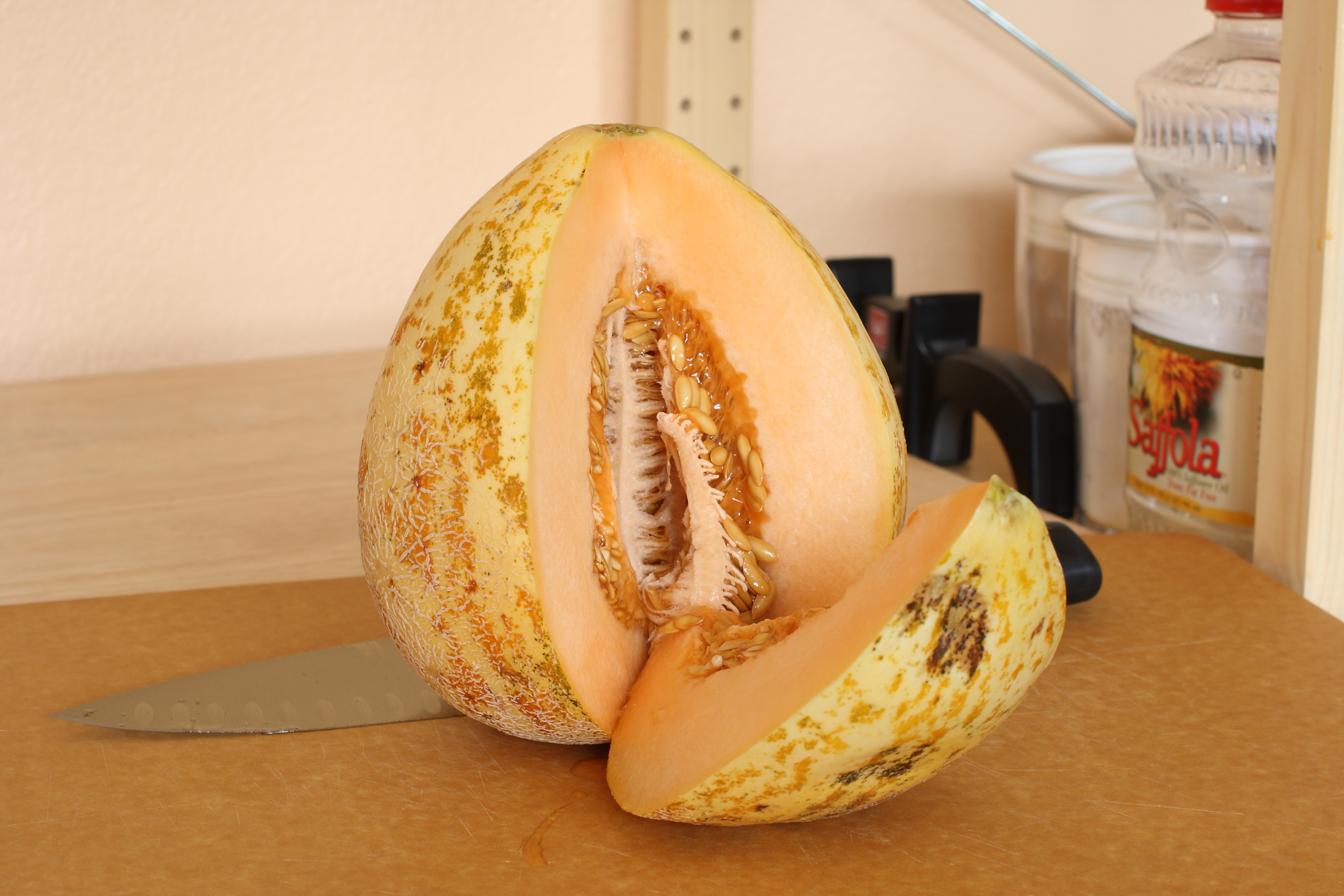
- Crane Melon
- Genus: Cucumis
- Species: melo
- Breeder: Oliver Crane

The Crane Melon is an heirloom melon developed by Oliver Crane in the early 20th century in Penngrove, California. It is grown and sold at specialty grocery stores and farmers markets and was first available from the Crane Melon Barn in Santa Rosa, California.

== Characteristics ==
A ripe Crane Melon averages four to seven pounds, with a distinctive taste due to its terroir. It varies in shape from round to slightly tapered, with a netted, spotted rind and orange flesh. The Crane Melon is only available in select stores in California, as the vine-ripened melons do not have the shelf life required to be suitable for shipping.

== History ==
Richard Hope Crane moved from Missouri to California during the gold rush in 1849, settling in the Santa Rosa region of Sonoma County in 1852. The Crane Melon Barn was built in 1868. In 1920, Oliver Crane, Richard Crane's son, developed the Crane Melon. He crossed several varieties of melons to create the cultivar. Sources differ on the exact crossing. The Ark of Taste labels it a cross between a Japanese melon and a cantaloupe, though others mention a four-way cross between a Japanese melon, Persian melon, an ambrosia melon, and a white melon.
