= Ciarimbolo =

Italian pork-based food

Ciarimbolo is an Italian meat produced from pig. It is pig offal that is spread on bread.

Ciarimbolo is listed on the Ark of Taste.
