= Jimmy Nardello Pepper =

Italian-American heirloom sweet pepper

Jimmy Nardello (also known as Jimmy Nardello's Italian Frying Pepper) is an heirloom sweet pepper cultivar of the species Capsicum annuum. It produces long, thin-walled, tapering fruit that ripen from green to red and are valued for frying.

The variety originates from Ruoti, in the Basilicata region of southern Italy. In 1887 the Nardello family emigrated from Ruoti to the United States and settled in Naugatuck, Connecticut; Angela Nardello carried seeds of the pepper from the family's Italian garden and grew them at her new home.

The pepper is named after Jimmy Nardello, one of the couple's eleven children, who continued to grow and save the seed. Before his death in 1983 he donated seed to the Seed Savers Exchange, through which the variety was preserved and distributed. It has since been listed on the Ark of Taste of the Slow Food movement.
