= Abgereifter =

- Country of origin: Austria
- Region: Innviertel
- Source of milk: Cows
- Pasteurised: No(?)

Abgereifter is a type of Graukäse typical for the Innviertel region of Austria, and little known outside of it. There is only one known family currently producing this cheese. It is currently listed in the Ark of Taste catalogue.

== See also ==
- List of cheeses
