= Cuccalar =

Italian unleavened bread

- Type: Bread
- Place of origin: Italy
- Region or state: Trentino
- Main ingredients: wheat flour, rye flour lard, buttermilk, salt

Cuccalar is a typical bread from the Valle dei Mocheni in the Autonomous Province of Trento. Once widespread throughout the valley, today it is produced almost exclusively in the municipality of Palù del Fersina; it is protected as a prodotto agroalimentare tradizionale and is also listed in the Ark of Taste.

== History ==
In the past, cuccalar was mainly prepared in summer, as a snack for the boys who pasture their cattle.

It was a poor bread, made with the worst quality flour and the by-product from butter production, buttermilk. With time the production was almost lost, and it only remains in some families and in some restaurants in the area of Palù del Fersina.

== Recipe ==
It is an unleavened bread, made from wheat and rye flour (in a 70/30 ratio), lard, buttermilk and salt. The dough is rolled out into discs about 1–1.5 cm (0.39–0.59 in) thick and 14 to 18 cm (5.5 to 7.1 in) in diameter and then baked in the oven. Baking is rather quick: 5–8 minutes.
