= Cherokee Purple (tomato) =

Heirloom tomato

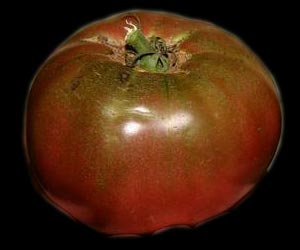
- Cherokee purple is a dusky red with green shoulders when ripe

Tomato (Solanum lycopersicum)
- Maturity: 80 days
- Type: Heirloom
- Vine: Indeterminate
- Plant height: 9 feet
- Fruit weight: 16 oz
- Leaf: Regular leaf
- Color: Dusky red, green shoulders
- Shape: Beefsteak

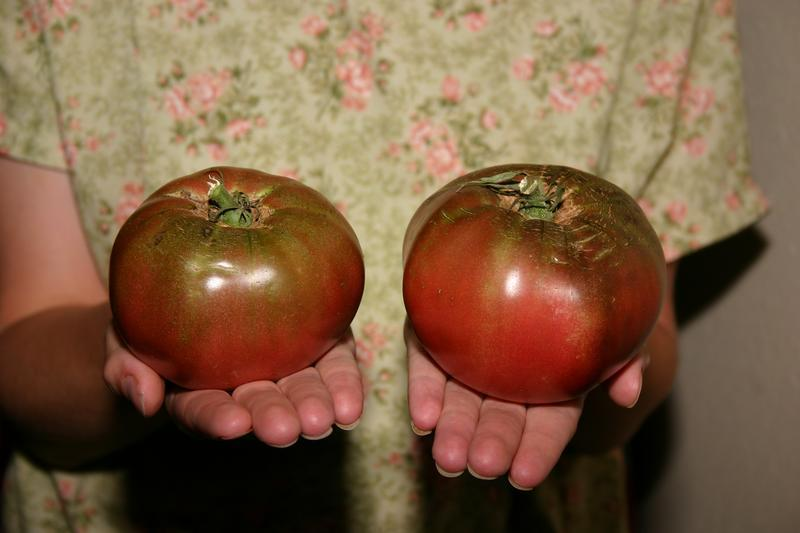
Home-grown Cherokee purple tomatoes

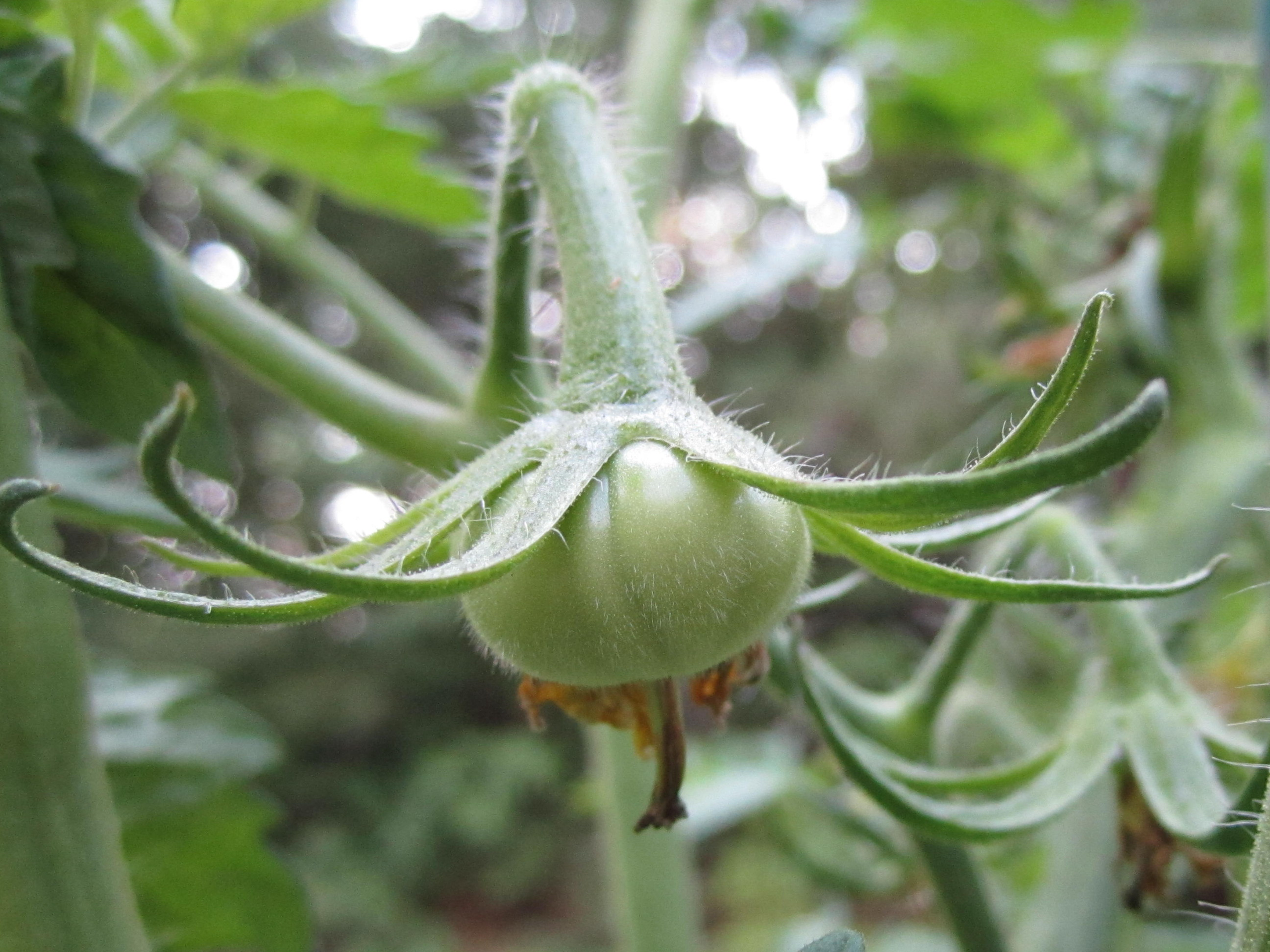
A Cherokee Purple tomato in the first stages of development.

Cherokee Purple is an heirloom variety of tomato that develops a fruit with a deep, dusky-rose color while maintaining a somewhat greenish hue near the stem when mature for eating. The deep crimson interior and clear skin combination give it its distinctive color. It was one of the first of the darker color group of tomatoes sometimes described as "blacks". Southern Exposure Seed Exchange was the first seed company to offer Cherokee Purple, released in limited quantity in 1993. The Cherokee Purple has become a popular heirloom variety.

== History ==
In 1990 John Green of Sevierville, Tennessee mailed heirloom tomato expert Craig LeHoullier seeds of an unnamed purple tomato. Green said that the tomato had originated with the Cherokees more than 100 years previously. LeHoullier named the tomato "Cherokee Purple" and sent seeds to the Southern Exposure Seed Exchange (SESE). Jeff McCormack, the owner of SESE, said that the tomato "tasted fine, but was kind of ugly -- people may not like it." SESE featured the Cherokee Purple in the 1993 seed catalog. LeHoullier distributed Cherokee Purple seeds to several market growers and one of them, Alex Hitt, who lived in North Carolina, had an immediate success growing and selling the tomato despite its ugly appearance. The tomato was described "as looking like a leg bruise."

In 2014, Cherokee Purple was named one of the top ten tomato heirloom varieties by the Seed Savers Exchange.

== Characteristics ==
Cherokee Purple tomatoes are beefsteak in style. They are also notable for having a dense, juicy texture, with small seed locules irregularly scattered throughout the flesh. The comparatively dark interior color is enhanced by the tendency of the seeds to be surrounded by green gel. In 1995, a skin color mutation of Cherokee Purple arose in Craig LeHoullier's North Carolina garden. It was named Cherokee Chocolate, and the yellow skin gives the variety a brownish mahogany hue. Cherokee Green arose in Craig's garden in 1997 from a planting of Cherokee Chocolate. It is one of several tomatoes whose flesh stays green when it ripens; the skin color is yellow, which provides a guide to indicate when the tomato is ripe and ready for harvest.

The Cherokee Purple tomato is most commonly available in the summer and fall. This tomato is best enjoyed fresh and is often used in BLTs and salads. It can also be used when making pizza and pasta sauces.

== See also ==
- List of tomato cultivars
