= Euskal Antzara =

Spanish breed of goose

- Conservation status: FAO (2007): endangered; DAD-IS (2021): at risk
- Other names: Oca Vasca
- Country of origin: Spain
- Distribution: Las Encartaciones/Enkarterri
- Standard: BOPV (Basque/Spanish)
- Use: meat; eggs

Traits
- Weight: Male: 7–9 kg; Female: 6–8 kg
- Egg colour: white

Classification
- Goose; Anser anser domesticus

The Euskal Antzara is a traditional Spanish breed of domestic goose. It originates in the historical Basque Country. It is the only recognised goose breed of that area, and one of two Spanish breeds of goose, the other being the Oca Empurdanesa. It is distributed mainly in the comarca of Enkarterri in the province of Bizkaia, particularly in the areas of Abanto, Balmaseda, Güeñes, Karrantza and Zalla.

== History ==
The Euskal Antzara is the traditional goose breed of the Basque Country; there is little documentation of its history. It was kept in limited numbers to supply meat and eggs.

It was included in the official list of Basque breeds of the País Vasco in 2001, and in 2006 it was added to the Catálogo Oficial de Razas de Ganado de España, the national register of livestock breeds of the Ministerio de Agricultura, Pesca y Alimentación. It is classified as a Raza Autóctona en Peligro de Extinción, an indigenous breed in danger of extinction.

In 2007 it was added to the Ark of Taste of the Slow Food Foundation.

== Use ==
The Euskal Antzara is reared principally for its eggs, and also for meat. The eggs are white, and weigh at least 160 g.
