= Colaz =

Italian confirmation cookie

- Place of origin: Italy
- Region or state: Friuli
- Main ingredients: Wheat flour, butter, salt, leavening agent, sugar, vanillin, cinnamon, cloves

Colaz, from the Friuli region of Italy, is a donut-shaped baked cookie made of wheat flour, butter, salt, leavening agent, and sugar. They are flavored with vanillin, cinnamon and cloves. A type of Confirmation biscuit, they are typical in Friuli and especially Carnia. Like a brasadé in Oltrepo Pavese during the nineteenth century, they are prepared for the sacrament of confirmation, tied with a ribbon, and used to decorate the confirmand's clothes. The biscuit surface is painted with egg yolk and decorated with colored confectionery. Pink or light blue ribbon is used. It is listed in the Ark of Taste.
