= Ermelo's orange =

Edible fruit cultivar

- Origin: Arcos de Valdevez Municipality, Portugal

Ermelo's Orange is a type of orange from Arcos de Valdevez, Viana do Castelo District, Norte Region in Portugal. It is listed on the Ark of Taste.

It takes its name from 'Ermelo', a parish in Arcos de Valdevez Municipality, Portugal. It was introduced to the region by Cistercian monks in the 12th century. They are very sweet, seedless and juicy with a thin peel, and are generally grown organically. They are harvested in April.
