= Brigasca =

Breed of sheep

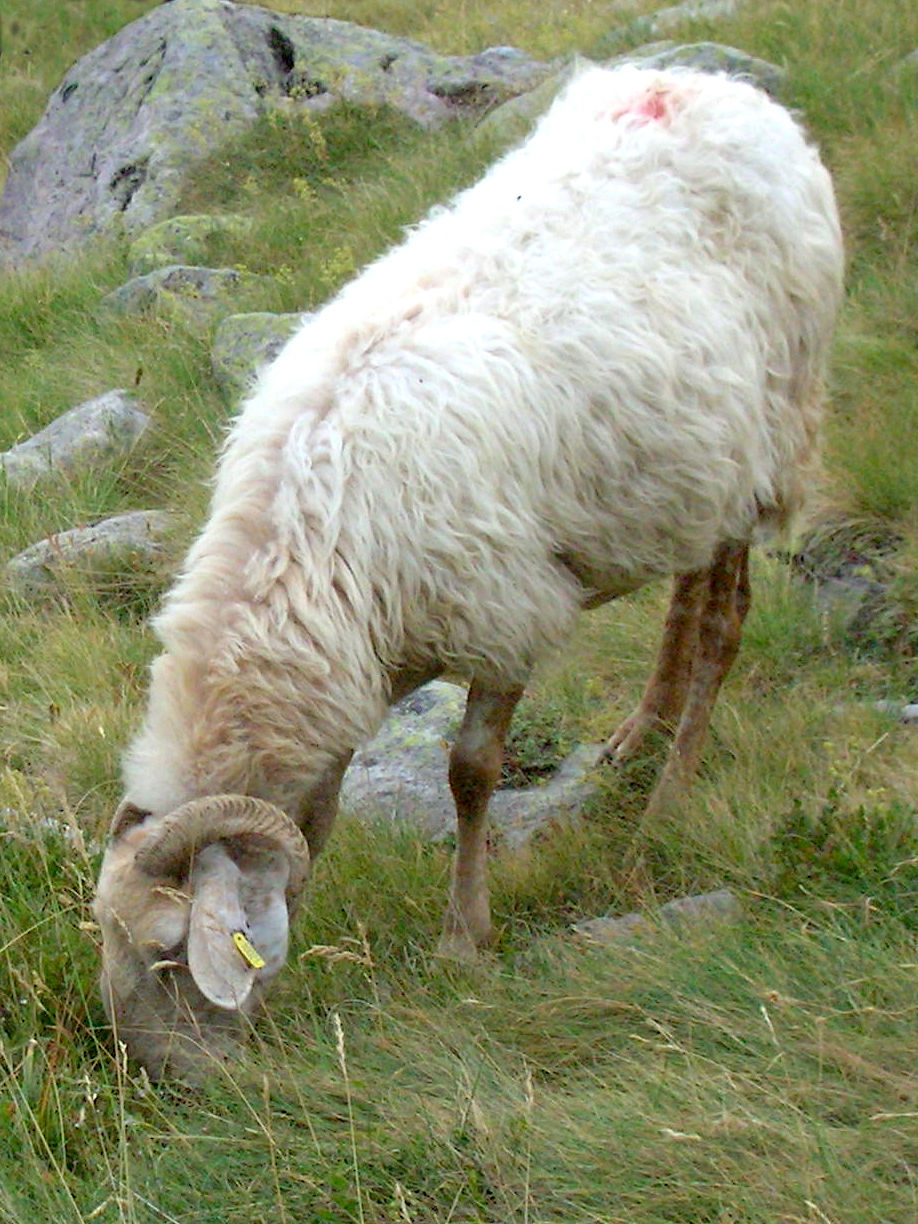
- In the Vallée des Merveilles, Tende, Alpes-Maritimes, Provence-Alpes-Côte d'Azur, France
- Conservation status: FAO (2007): not at risk
- Other names: Brigasque
- Country of origin: Italy; France
- Distribution: province of Imperia; province of Savona; département of Alpes-Maritimes
- Standard: MIPAAF
- Use: dual-purpose, milk and meat

Traits
- Weight: Male: 80–100 kg; Female: 65–70 kg
- Height: Male: 65–70 cm; Female: 50–60 cm
- Skin colour: pink with darker markings
- Wool colour: white
- Face colour: white
- Horn status: about 80% are horned

The Brigasca, French: Brigasque, is a breed of sheep from Liguria in north-west Italy and the département of Alpes-Maritimes in south-eastern France. It takes its name from the town of La Brigue (Italian: Briga Marittima), which was until 1947 in the Italian province of Cuneo. The Brigasca is raised in the provinces of Imperia and Savona in Italy, and neighbouring areas in France. It appears to have origins in common with the Frabosana and Delle Langhe breeds. It is one of the forty-two autochthonous local sheep breeds of limited distribution for which a herd-book is kept by the Associazione Nazionale della Pastorizia, the Italian national association of sheep-breeders.

In 2013 total numbers recorded in Italy for the breed were 3008; the French population was reported in 2001 to be 570.
