= Xalda =

Breed of sheep

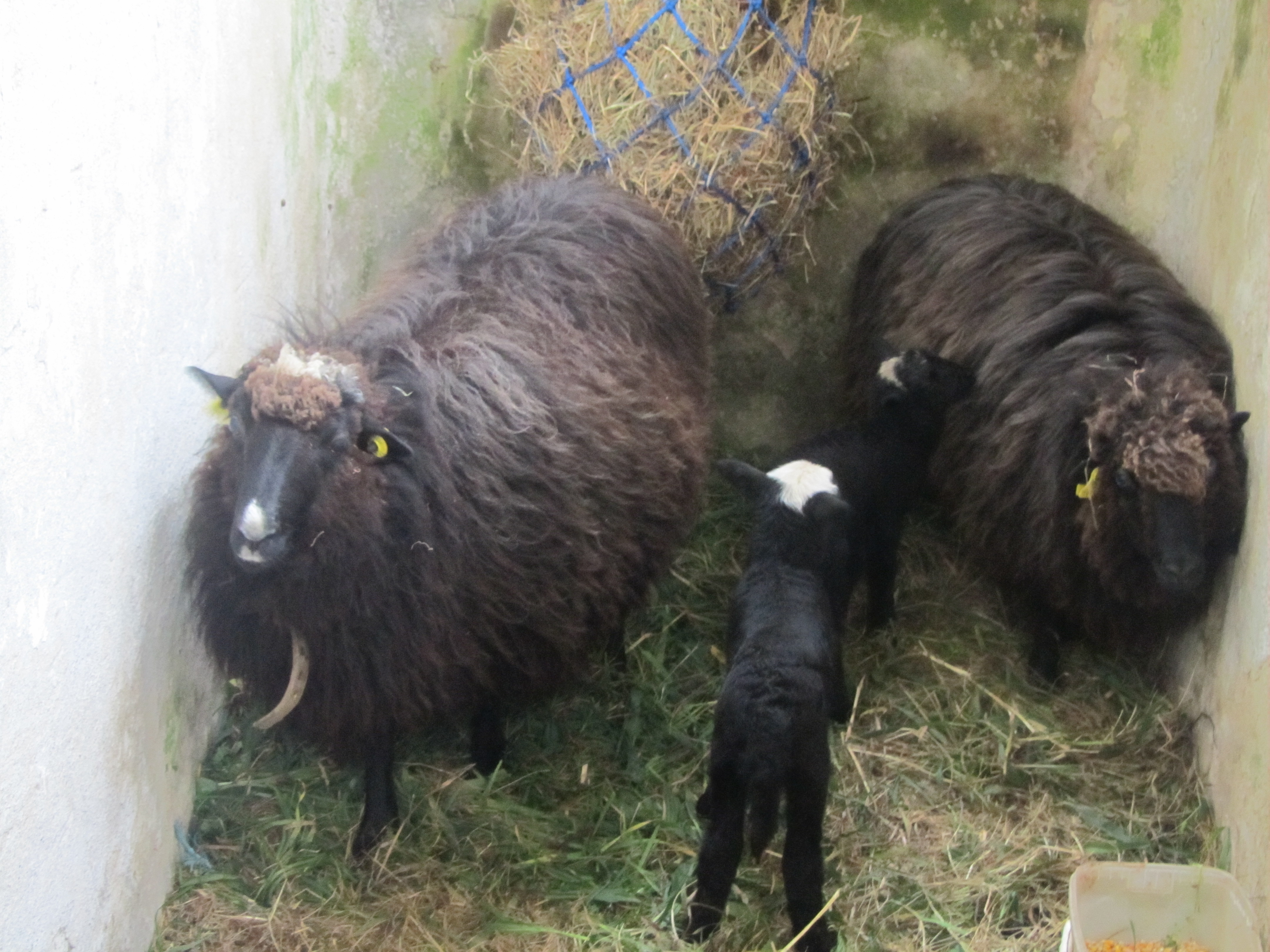
- Two Xalda ewes and their lambs
- Conservation status: Endangered
- Country of origin: Spain
- Distribution: Mainly the Asturias province of Northern Spain
- Use: Meat, wool

Traits
- Weight: Male: 33kg; Female: 22kg
- Height: Male: 61cm; Female: 55cm
- Wool color: Black, white, grey
- Horn status: Males have horns, females are polled

The Xalda (Asturleonese for lowland dweller) is an endangered breed of sheep indigenous to the Asturias province of Northern Spain.

== History ==
The Xalda is one of the oldest sheep breeds in Spain. It is first recorded in 27 BCE, by the Greek historian Estruban, who wrote of black tunics being made by the Asturi tribe out of the Xalda's wool. The Xalda likely traces its lineage back to the ancient Ovis aries celticus, and is related to other sheep of Celtic origin, including the Ouessant, the Black Wales, the morite, and several German breeds. Most of its related Iberian ancestors are extinct, with one notable exception being the very rare Bordaleira of Northern Portugal.

The sheep used to be very popular within its native range, with an estimated 6,000 being alive in the 12th century. During its height, the Xalda was an important part of the culture and history of Asturias. However, the breed began to decline in numbers by the 1940s due to abandonment of the countryside in its native range. It also faced competition from specialty dairy breeds, which became popular among cheese makers. Whatever the reason for the decline, by 1980 only 800 purebred Xalda remained, and by the founding of the breeders association in 1992, only 400 purebred animals remained.

== Characteristics ==
The Xalda is a small, highly agile sheep, with rams usually weighing around 33 kg and standing 61 cm tall and ewes weighing around 22 kg and measuring 51 cm tall. Their wool is usually black or white, but can take on a reddish tint as they grow. Although it is rare, they can be gray in color, as well. Black and gray individuals can have spots on their heads. It has a similar phenotype to other Celtic sheep breeds in the Atlantic arc.

== Uses ==
The Xalda is often raised for meat. The meat from Xalda lambs is generally regarded to be of a very high quality. The meat possesses an extremely high protein content and is very tender. They were also raised for wool during the breed's peak, and in some towns their wool would comprise almost all the town's clothing.

== Conservation status ==
At the height of the breed's population, the Xalda was very widespread in Asturias, with an estimated 6,000 living in the 12th century. However, the breed decreased in popularity due to abandonment of the countryside in its native range and competition from more commercially viable breeds. By the 1980s, only 800 head remained, and by time the breeders association was founded in 1992, there were only 400 Xalda left. However, the founding if the Xalda breeders association in 1992, ACOXA (Asociaciòn de Criadores d'Oveya Xalda) helped the efforts to conserve the breed greatly, although it still suffers from a lack of genetic diversity. Nonetheless, the breed's population has increased greatly in recent years, and numbers around 1,700 in 2017. A report in 2025 estimates 7,000 Xalda sheep in Asturias.
