= Sardo Modicana =

Breed of cattle

- Country of origin: Italy: Sardinia
- Use: beef

Traits
- Coat: from pale red to deep wine-red
- Horn status: horned
- Cattle; Bos (primigenius) taurus

The Sardo Modicana is an Italian breed of beef cattle from the Mediterranean island of Sardinia. It is one of the sixteen minor Italian cattle breeds of limited diffusion recognised and protected by the Ministero delle Politiche Agricole Alimentari e Forestali, the Italian ministry of agriculture.
