= Bardiccio =

Italian sausage

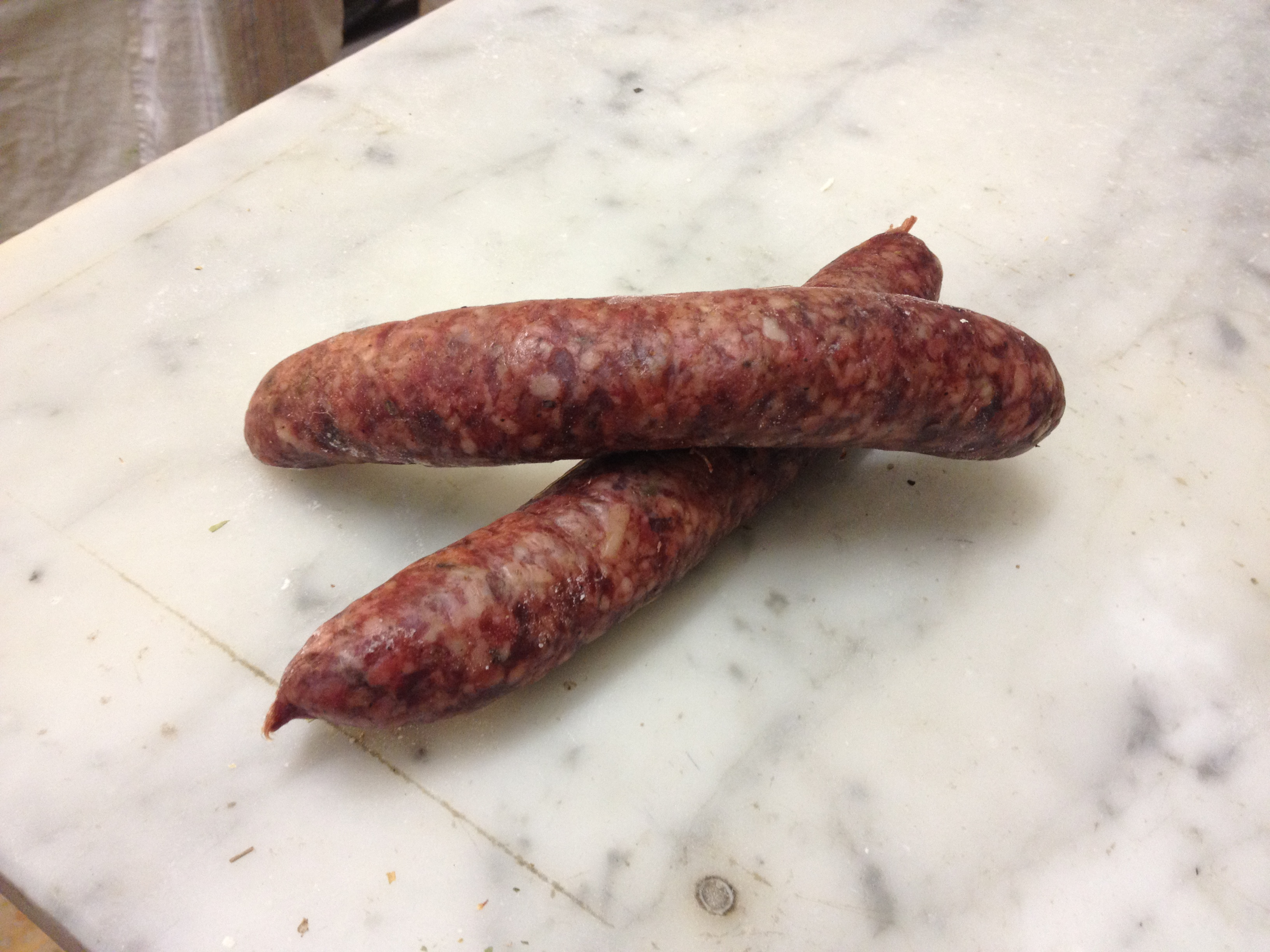
- Place of origin: Italy
- Region or state: Tuscany
- Food energy (per serving): 340 kcal. per 100 g.

Bardiccio, also known as bardiccio fiorentino or salsiccia matta, is a typical Tuscan cold cut, similar to burischio, whose preparation is based on the use of the less valuable and rich in blood parts of pork. Its typical dark red color depends on the quantity of heart—generally bovine—used in the mixture. Bardiccio has the characteristic shape of a sausage, but it is longer and is stuffed into a pork casing, tied with string. It is produced from September to May and is eaten unaged.

Bardiccio is part of the Presidia and Ark of Taste of Slow Food under the name bardiccio fiorentino and is included among the prodotti agroalimentari tradizionali (PAT) by the Tuscany region under the heading "Fresh meat (and offal) and their preparation".

== Historical references ==
Originally, bardiccio was invented as a dish of the so-called poor Tuscan tradition. In a logic of food recycling—typical of peasant families or however less affluent—all the less noble parts of the pig and of the ox, including the entrails, were recovered. Bardiccio, besides being unaged, was seasoned in order to be used during the year as a stuffing or as an ingredient to flavor vegetable soups.

== Production ==
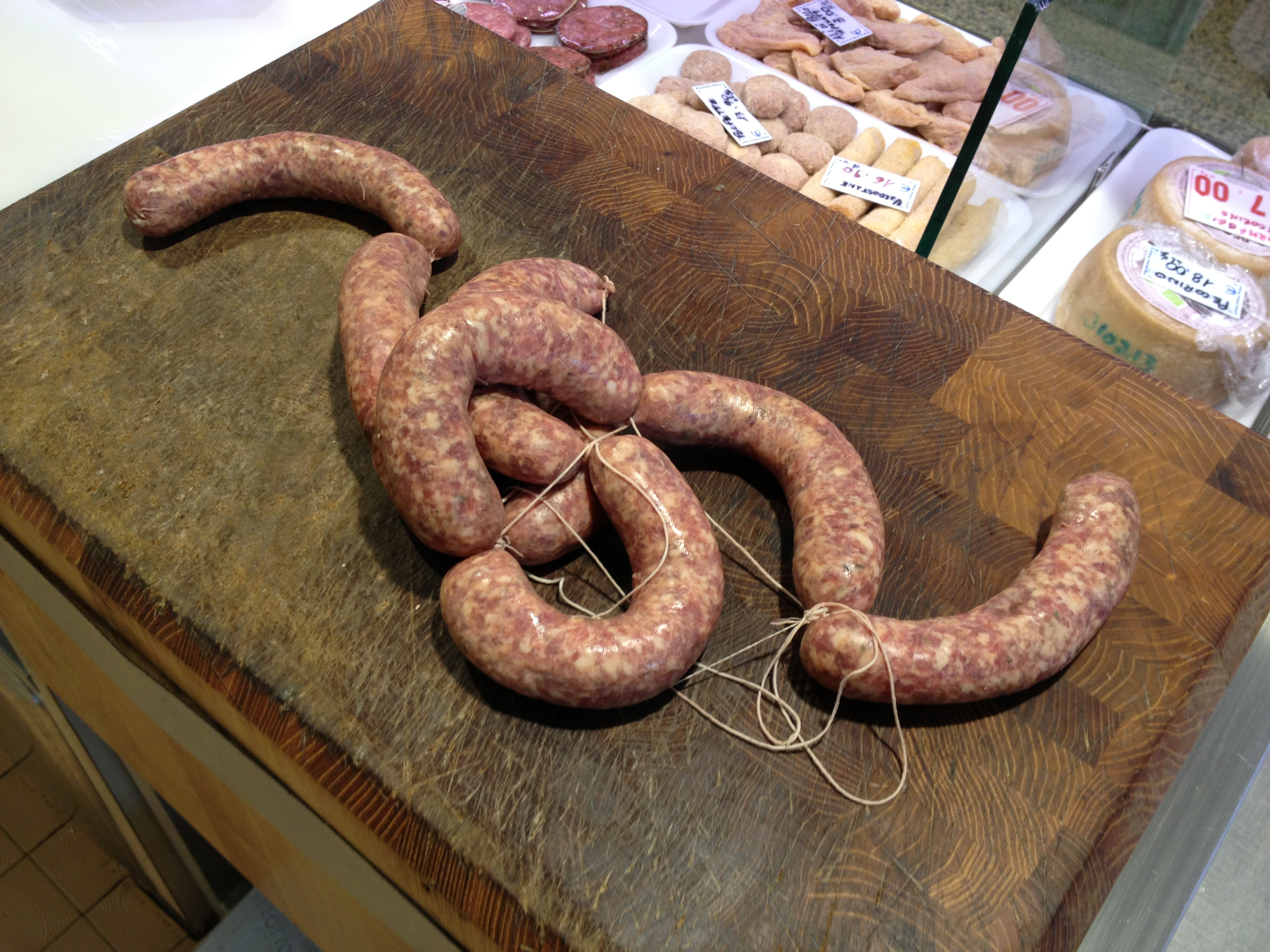
Bardiccio tied with string on the counter of a butcher shop

The Regional Agency for Development and Innovation in the Agricultural-Forestry Sector (ARSIA) estimates an annual production of about 400–500 quintals of bardiccio, divided between butchers (30–60 kg per week) and delicatessens (80–100 kg per week).

There is no codified recipe for bardiccio, as every small producer mixes the various ingredients according to its own tradition.

== Manifestations ==
Even though they are limited to the province of Florence, there are many enogastronomical manifestations connected to the bardiccio:

- Festa del bardiccio, Dicomano (December)
- Palio del bardiccio, Pelago (March)
- Sagra del bardiccio, Vicchio (O)
- Sagra del fusigno, Londa (24 December)
- Sagra del tortello e bardiccio, Rufina (fall-summer)
- Sagra della zucca gialla e del bardiccio, Pelago (October)
- Toscanello d'oro, Pontassieve (May–June)
