= Roccaverano goat =

Breed of goat

Roccaverano
- Conservation status: FAO (2007): not at risk
- Country of origin: Italy
- Distribution: Piemonte
- Standard: MIPAAF
- Use: milk, also meat

Traits
- Weight: Male: 70–80 kg; Female: 55 kg
- Height: Male: 85–90 cm; Female: 80–85 cm
- Coat: variable: white, brown or black
- Horn status: usually hornless
- Beard: usually bearded
- Tassels: present in about 50%
- Goat; Capra aegagrus hircus

The Roccaverano is an Italian breed of large domestic goat from the Langhe, in the provinces of Asti and Cuneo, in Piemonte in north-western Italy. It is raised mainly in the Langa Astigiana, mostly within the Comunità montana Langa Astigiana Val Bormida}, and is named for the town and comune of Roccaverano in that area. The origins of the breed are unknown.

The Roccaverano is one of the forty-three autochthonous Italian goat breeds of limited distribution for which a herdbook is kept by the Associazione Nazionale della Pastorizia, the Italian national association of sheep- and goat-breeders. At the end of 2013 the registered population was variously reported as 3117 and as 2390.

== Use ==
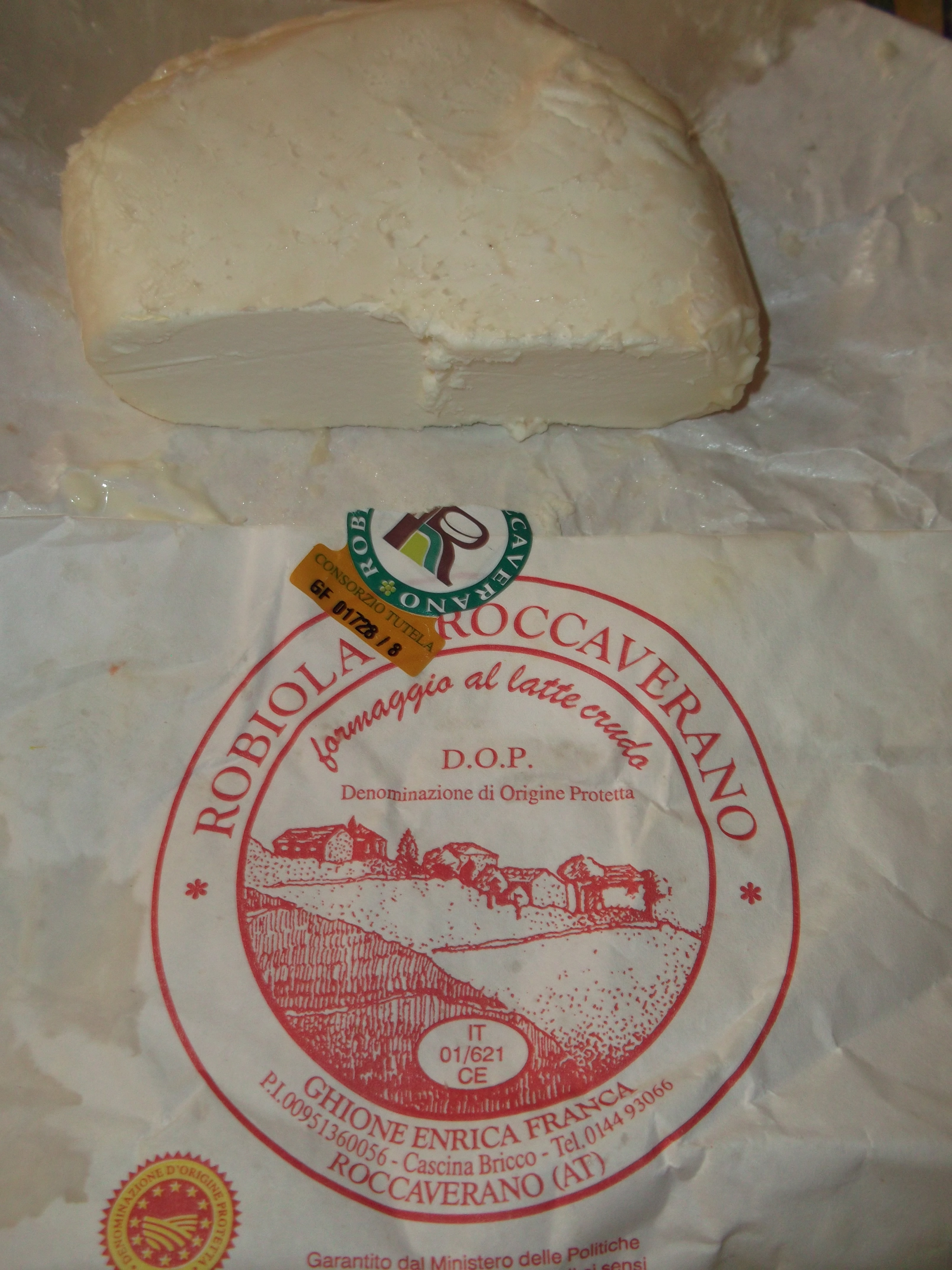
Robiola di Roccaverano cheese

The milk yield of the Roccaverano per lactation of about 240 days is 246±76 litres for primiparous, 378±146 litres for secondiparous, and 397±154 litres for pluriparous, nannies. The milk averages 3.30% fat and 3.05% protein, and is all used to make robiola, either Robiola di Roccaverano, made with a mixture of cow's milk, goat's milk and sheep's milk, which has DOP status; or the pure goat's-milk Robiola di Roccaverano pura caprina.

Kids 30–45 days old and weighing 12–14 kg are slaughtered at Easter time.
