= Cinisara =

Breed of cattle

- Country of origin: Italy: Sicily: province of Palermo
- Use: Dual-purpose: milk and beef

Traits
- Coat: Black, sometimes with white dorsal and ventral stripe
- Horn status: Horned

The Cinisara is a cattle breed from the province of Palermo, in the Italian island of Sicily. It is one of the 16 minor Italian cattle breeds of limited diffusion. The breed is recognised and protected by the Ministero delle Politiche Agricole Alimentari e Forestali, the Italian ministry of agriculture.
