= Bamberg potato =

Potato cultivar

Bamberg 'potato'
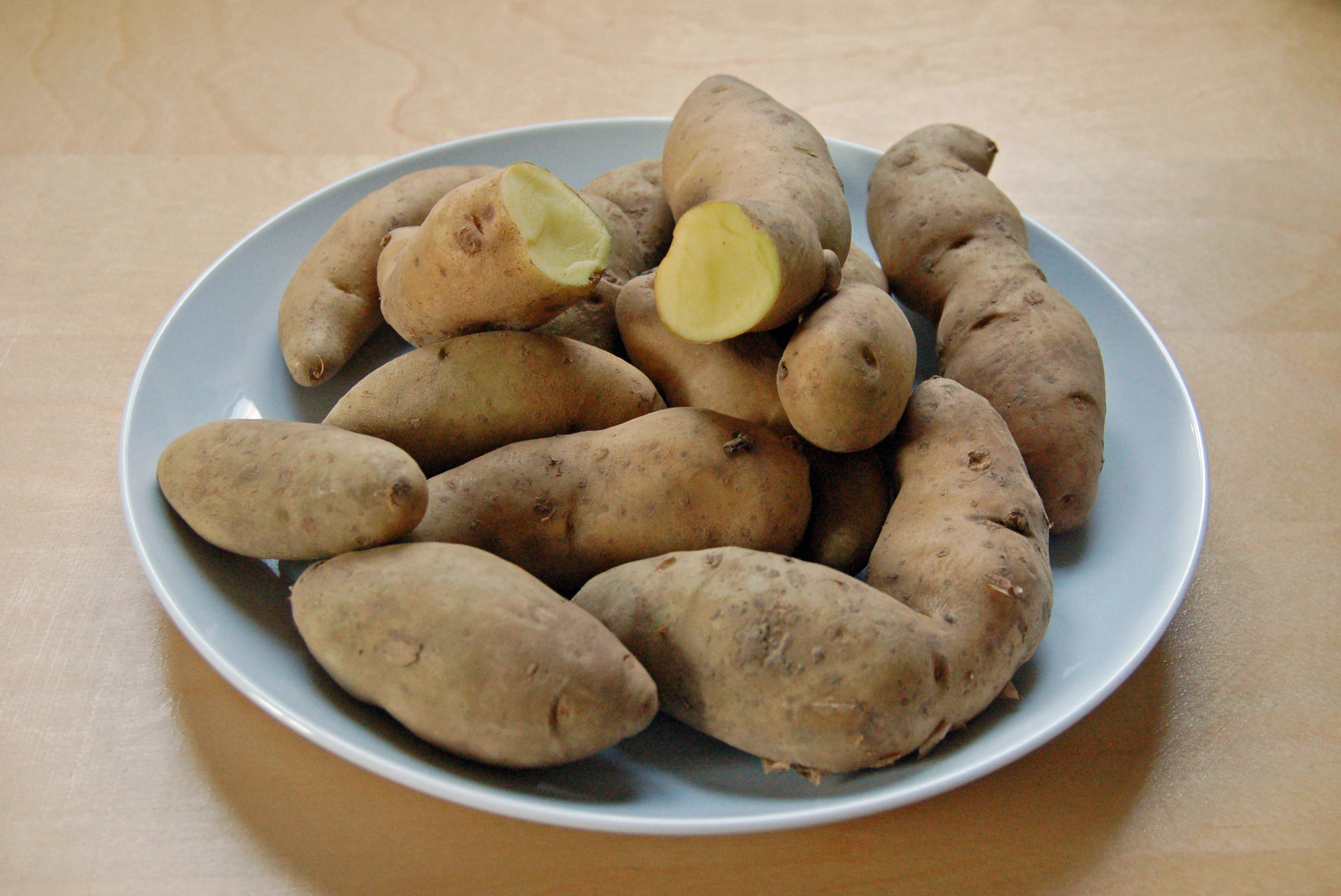
- 'Bamberg' potatoes
- Genus: solanum
- Species: Solanum tuberosum
- Cultivar: Bamberg
- Origin: Germany

The Bamberg potato (German: Bamberger Hörnla) is an old potato variety from Franconia. It takes its name from the town of Bamberg.

It is a small, typically long and irregularly shaped potato with a waxy texture. The Bamberg has firm, light yellow flesh with a nutty flavour. It is grown only in Southern Germany and is protected by the European Union as a regional speciality. It was about to become extinct as cultivation is very laborious and the yield is rather low. It is little grown commercially by farmers but people do grow it in gardens for home use. Outside its area of origin, the Bamberg can be bought in delicatessen shops, from specialised traders, farmers' markets, and in organic grocery stores.

Freshplaza chose it as its potato of the year for 2008.
