= Seed Savers Exchange =

Non-profit seedbank organization

- Seed Savers Exchange logo.
- Abbreviation: SSE
- Formation: 1975
- Founder: Kent Whealy and Diane Ott Whealy
- Headquarters: "Heritage Farm": 3094 North Winn Rd, Decorah, Iowa 52101, USA
- Region served: All 50 United States and internationally
- Products: Seeds, plants, gardening tools and resources
- Services: Facilitates an online and postal seed swap
- Members: 13,000 members
- Budget: About $5 million USD
- Website: seedsavers.org

Seed Savers Exchange, or SSE, is a non-profit organization based near Decorah, Iowa, that preserves heirloom plant varieties through regeneration, distribution and seed exchange. It is one of the largest nongovernmental seedbanks in the United States. The mission of SSE is to preserve the world’s diverse but endangered garden heritage for future generations by building a network of people committed to collecting, conserving, and sharing heirloom seeds and plants, and educating people about the value of genetic and cultural diversity. Since 1975, Seed Savers has produced an annual yearbook of members’ seed offerings, as well as multiple editions of The Garden Seed Inventory, and The Fruit, Nut and Berry Inventory. SSE also publishes Seed to Seed: Seed Saving and Growing Techniques for Vegetable Gardeners. The nonprofit has sold seeds to about 600 retail stores in the United States and Canada.

== History ==
The SSE was founded by Kent Whealy and Diane Ott Whealy in 1975, inspired to protect and preserve heirloom varieties after they were given the seeds of two heirloom plants (a German tomato and a morning glory vine) that her great-grandfather had brought to the U.S. from Bavaria in 1870. The organization hosted its first seed swap the same year of its founding among thirty gardeners on a six-paged list of seeds.

SSE began a commercial seed catalog in 2000. Today, it has more than 13,000 members worldwide, passing on more than one million seed samples and distributing over 20,000 varieties of endangered seeds. The SSE publishes a list of members' seeds annually in the Seed Savers Yearbook, complete with a description of the crop and its known history.

It is headquartered at the 890-acre (3.6 km^{2}) Heritage Farm, located six miles from Decorah, Iowa. Heritage Farm was originally purchased in 1986. A certified organic farm, Heritage is called the "most diverse farm in the world" by ethnobotanist Gary Paul Nabhan. At Heritage Farm, more than 25,000 rare fruit, vegetable, and plant varieties are regenerated, refrigerated and preserved in a central collection. It has its own underground seed vault held at below-freezing temperatures. Heritage Farm keeps a historical record of each variety it maintains. A herd of White Park Cattle as well as 900 apple tree varieties are also maintained on the farm. Heritage Farm holds a visitors' center that offers events and classes.

In December 2007, Seed Savers Exchange made an inaugural deposit of nearly 500 varieties to the Svalbard Global Seed Vault that opened on February 26, 2008 in Svalbard, Norway. It was the only citizen-led group in the United States to contribute to the Svalbard Global Seed Vault for opening day. SSE also has seeds at the National Center for Genetic Resources Preservation located in Fort Collins, Colorado, USA.

SSE is involved in a seed donation program for schools and community gardens.

== See also ==
- Jimmy Nardello Pepper
- Community gardening in the United States
- Heirloom plant
- Orthodox seed
- Recalcitrant seed
- Seed swap
