= Beaver Dam pepper =

Capsicum annuum cultivar

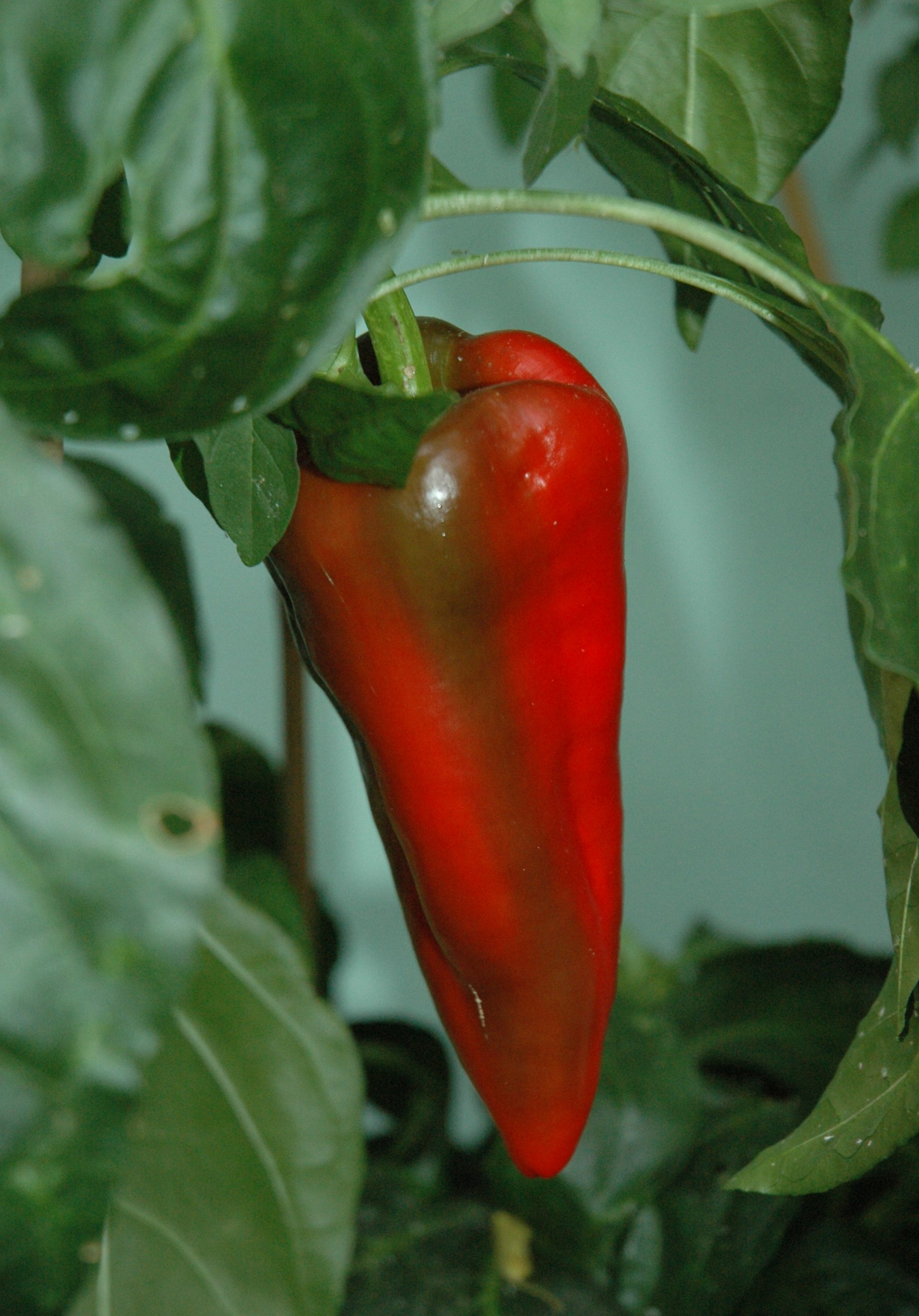
- Species: Capsicum annuum
- Origin: Wisconsin
- Heat: Mild
- Scoville scale: 500–1000 SHU

The Beaver Dam pepper is a Capsicum annuum cultivar derived from seeds brought to Beaver Dam, Wisconsin, by Hungarian immigrant Joe Hussli in 1912. It is listed in the Slow Food Foundation's "Ark of Taste", and is the subject of an annual festival held in Beaver Dam each September.

== Characteristics ==
Beaver Dam pepper plants are sensitive to moisture and produce more fruits in dry conditions. The fruits are horn-shaped, thick-walled and red or orange when ripe, reaching 6 to 9 inches in length. Because of the size of the fruits, the plant may require a trellis or cage for support. They are eaten raw, stuffed, or in soups and stews.
