= Cabannina =

Breed of cattle

- Country of origin: Italy: Liguria
- Use: Dual-purpose: milk and beef

Traits
- Coat: Dark chestnut or light brown, pale dorsal stripe
- Horn status: Horned

The Cabannina is a cattle breed from the Liguria region of Italy. It is one of the 16 minor Italian cattle breeds "of limited diffusion" recognised and protected by the Ministero delle Politiche Agricole Alimentari e Forestali, the Italian ministry of agriculture.
