= Guirra =

Breed of sheep

- Other names: Levant Red, Sudat
- Country of origin: Spain
- Distribution: Spanish provinces of Alicante, Valencia, and Castellón de la Plana
- Use: Meat

Traits
- Skin color: Dark skin
- Wool color: Red and white

Guirra (also known as Levant Red, Sudat) is a breed of domesticated sheep found in Spain. Most recently, the Guirra has been bred mostly for meat.

== Characteristics ==
Lambs have a reddish-brown fleece. Their wool lightens as they mature to a red and cream color mixed fleece.

The ears, medium in size, project horizontally from the top of the head. The fleece covers the trunk, neck, and part of legs. The Guirra does not grow a dense wool and is considered to be quite greasy.
