= Taillé aux greubons =

Swiss pastry baked with pieces of pork rind

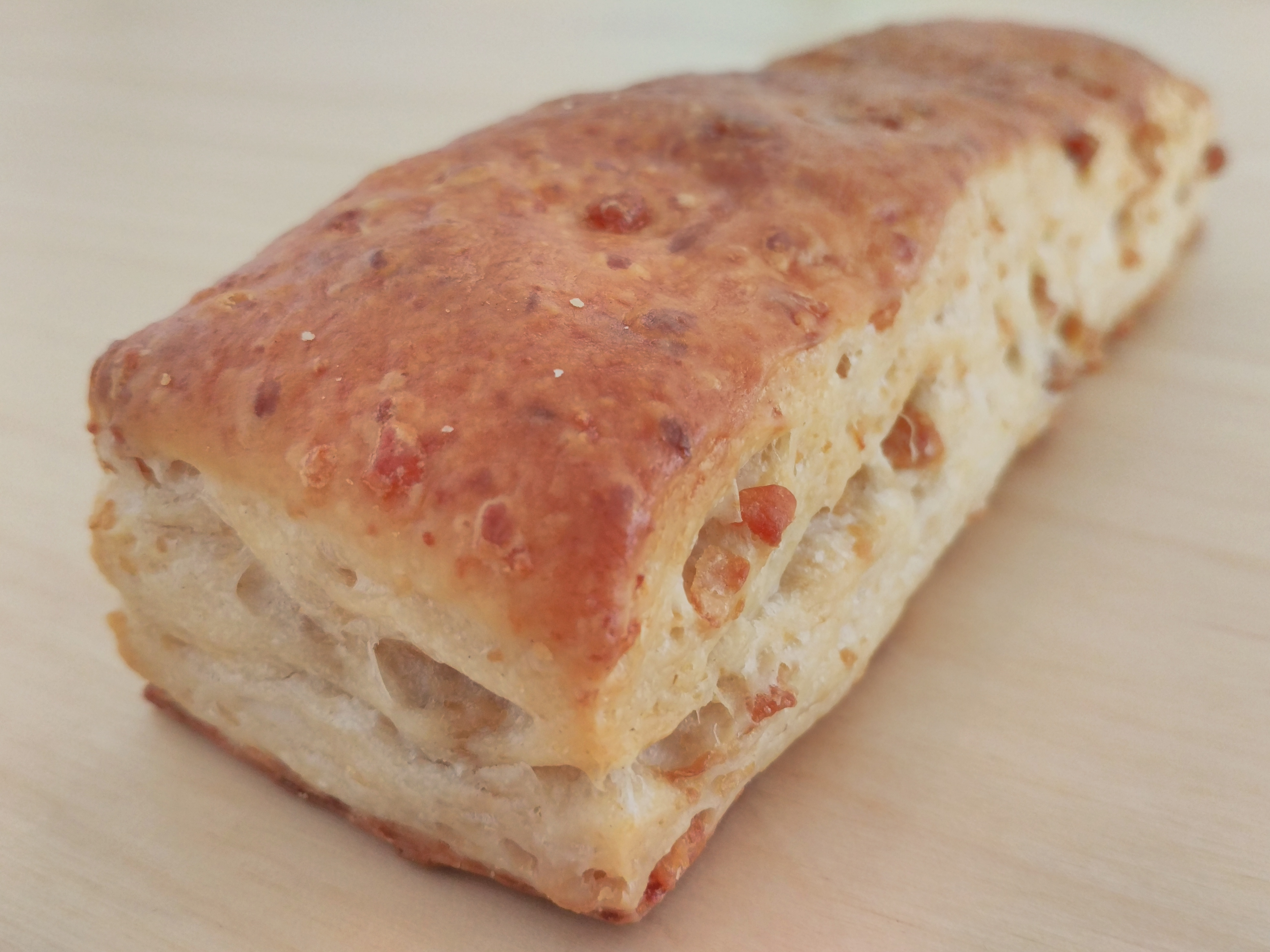

Taillé aux greubons is a salted bakery specialty from Vaud, in Switzerland. "Greubon" is a Swiss term for the crackling produced as residue from rendering lard.

The taillés are made of puff pastry with the greubons embedded in them.
