= Bianca di Saluzzo =

Italian breed of chicken

- Conservation status: recovering
- Other names: Bianca di Cavour
- Country of origin: Italy
- Use: dual-purpose breed

Traits
- Weight: Male: 2.5–2.7 kg (5.5–6 lb); Female: 2.0–2.1 kg (4.5 lb)
- Skin colour: yellow
- Egg colour: white
- Comb type: single

Classification
- Chicken; Gallus gallus domesticus

The Bianca di Saluzzo is a traditional Italian breed of chicken originating in the Piemonte region of north-western Italy. It takes its name either from the town of Saluzzo, in the province of Cuneo, or from the former Marquisate of Saluzzo, which approximately coincides with its area of distribution. It may also be called the Bianca di Cavour, after the nearby town of Cavour, in the Province of Turin.

== History ==
The Bianca di Saluzzo was once abundant in Piemonte, especially in the historic Marquisate of Saluzzo and in neighbouring comuni such as Cavour, Villafranca and Garzigliana. In the 1960s, industrialisation and intensive agriculture caused a decline in the breed, which is suitable only for free-range management. Recovery began in 1999 under the auspices of the Istituto Professionale per l'Agricoltura e l'Ambiente of Verzuolo, in the province of Cuneo. A breed standard has been submitted to the Federazione Italiana Associazioni Avicole, the federation of Italian poultry associations.

Breed numbers remain low. A study published in 2007 used a figure of approximately 700 for the total breeding stock, of which approximately 200 were cocks.

== Characteristics ==
The Bianca di Saluzzo is white, with yellow skin, legs and ear-lobes. The comb is single and large, with 4–6 points. Average weight is 2.5–2.7 kg for cocks, 2.0–2.1 kg for hens.

== Use ==
The Bianca di Saluzzo is a dual-purpose breed. Hens begin to lay at 6–7 months, and may lay some 180 eggs per year; the eggs are white and weigh approximately 50 g.

For meat production, birds may reach a final weight of 1.7–1.8 kg at about 22 weeks; capons weigh around 3 kg at 30 weeks.
