= Drenthe Heath =

Sheep breed

Drenthe Heath Sheep
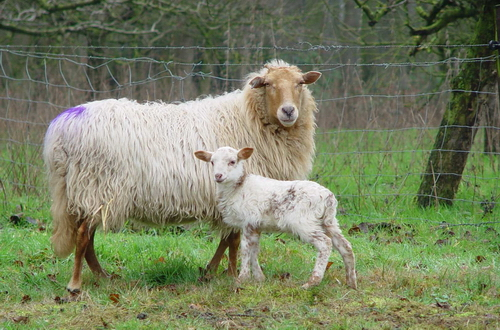
- Other names: Drents Heideschaap
- Country of origin: Netherlands
- Use: vegetation management

Traits
- Weight: Male: 50 kg (110 lb); Female: 45 kg (99 lb)
- Height: Male: 52 cm (20 in); Female: 47 cm (19 in)
- Horn status: Rams are horned and ewes can have horns or are polled (hornless)

The Drenthe Heath Sheep (Drents Heideschaap, Dutch) is a domesticated breed of sheep originating in the Netherlands. It is raised primarily for vegetation management.

It is said to be the oldest surviving breed of sheep in Europe. Approx. 4000BCE they were introduced to Drenthe. The breed probably came with settlers from France.
