= Delle Langhe =

Breed of sheep

- Conservation status: at risk of extinction
- Other names: Pecora delle Langhe; Langarola
- Country of origin: Italy
- Distribution: Piedmont, other regions
- Standard: MIPAAF
- Use: primarily for milk

Traits
- Weight: Male: 80–90 kg; Female: 60–70 kg
- Height: Male: 80–83 cm; Female: 70–72 cm
- Wool color: ivory-white
- Face color: ivory-white, with silky sheen
- Horn status: hornless in both sexes

The Delle Langhe, also called Pecora delle Langhe or Langarola, is a breed of domestic sheep indigenous to Piedmont, in north-western Italy. It is a rough-woolled breed of southern Mediterranean type, and originates from the mountainous area of the Alta Langa, where the Apennines meet the Alps, in the province of Cuneo. It is raised mainly in the Langhe, but is found in several other regions of Italy including Abruzzo, Basilicata, Emilia–Romagna, Liguria and Tuscany.

== History ==
In the early twentieth century, attempts made to improve the meat yield of the breed by cross-breeding with Bergamasca stock were unsuccessful. Cross-breeding with French Lacaune and Larzac stock to improve milk production was also tried, but was soon abandoned in favour of selective breeding within the existing breed.

The Delle Langhe breed is one of the seventeen autochthonous Italian sheep breeds for which a genealogical herdbook is kept by the Associazione Nazionale della Pastorizia, the Italian national association of sheep-breeders. Numbers were estimated at 40000 in 1930, and at 12000 in 1983. In 2006, 3653 head were registered in the herdbook; the conservation status of the breed was listed as "not at risk" by the Food and Agriculture Organization of the United Nations in 2007. In 2013 the total number recorded was 1800. The breed is listed as "at risk of extinction" by the region of Piemonte.

== Use ==
The milk yield of the Delle Langhe breed, over and above that taken by the lambs, is about 102±34 litres per lactation for primiparous, and 166±63 litres for pluriparous, ewes; it may reach 300 litres per lactation. The milk has 6–7% fat and 5–6% protein. Lambs weigh 13–15 kg at 30 days, and are usually slaughtered at about that weight. Rams yield about 3 kg, ewes about 2.5 kg, of low-grade wool.

The milk is used in Toma di Murazzano, a DOP cheese made with sheep's milk or a mixture of sheep's and cow's milk.
