= Bertoni =

Bertoni is an Italian surname. Notable people with the surname include:

- Andrea Bertoni O.S.M. (1454–1483), Roman Catholic priest and saint, patron of Faenza
- Andrea Bertoni, Italian business executive
- Angelo Bertoni (1933–2021), member of the Queensland Legislative Assembly
- Arnoldo de Winkelried Bertoni (1878–1973), Paraguayan zoologist
- Daniel Bertoni (born 1955), former Argentine footballer
- Ferdinando Bertoni (1725–1813), Italian composer and organist
- Flaminio Bertoni (1903–1964), automobile designer
- Francesca Bertoni (born 1993), Italian female 3000 metres steeplechaser
- Gaspar Bertoni (1777–1853), Italian saint
- Letizia Bertoni (born 1937), former Italian hurdler
- Luca Bertoni (born 1992), Italian professional footballer
- Luigi Bertoni (1872–1947), Italian-born anarchist writer and typographer
- Moisés Santiago Bertoni (1857–1929), botanist known for his studies on Stevia
  - Moises Bertoni Foundation, for the protection and sustainable development of natural resources in Paraguay
- Remo Bertoni (1909–1973), Italian professional road bicycle racer
- Remo Bertoni (footballer) (1929–1993), Italian retired footballer and manager
- Sergio Bertoni (1915–1995), Italian football (soccer) player
- Xavier Bertoni (born 1988), French Freestyle skier

== See also ==
- 15908 Bertoni, minor planet discovered by the Kitt Peak on October 2, 1997
- Bertoni's antbird, species of bird in the family Thamnophilidae
- GDE Bertoni, trophy and medal manufacturing company
- Bertoni's antbird: species of bird in the family Thamnophilidae
- Doctor Moisés Bertoni, village in the Caazapá department of Paraguay
- Bertone
