= Valle del Belice sheep =

Italian breed of sheep

Valle del Belice
- Conservation status: not at risk
- Country of origin: Italy
- Distribution: Valle del Belice, south-western Sicily
- Use: triple-purpose, predominantly for milk

Traits
- Weight: Male: 100 kg; Female: 72 kg
- Height: Male: 85 cm; Female: 73 cm
- Wool colour: white
- Face colour: white

The Valle del Belice is an Italian breed of domestic sheep from the Valle del Belice, the valley of the Belice river in south-western Sicily, from which it takes its name. It is raised mainly in its area of origin in the provinces of Agrigento, Palermo and Trapani, but is also found elsewhere in Sicily and in southern Italy. It appears to result from the three-way hybridisation of the Sicilian Pinzirita and Comisana breeds with Sarda stock brought from Sardinia. It has the resistance to harsh winter conditions of the Pinzirita and the Sarda, the resistance to high summer temperatures of the Comisana, and the good milk yield of the Comisana and the Sarda. Occasionally a pecora scimmia ("monkey sheep") is born, with partial or total alopecia of the head and limbs; this is caused by a recessive gene.

The Valle del Belice is one of the seventeen autochthonous Italian sheep breeds for which a genealogical herdbook is kept by the Associazione Nazionale della Pastorizia, the Italian national association of sheep-breeders. Total numbers for the breed were estimated at 60000 in 1994; in 2013 the number recorded in the herdbook was 116938.

Milk yield is given by one source as an average 147 litres for primiparous, and 209–214 litres for pluriparous, ewes; another gives 270 litres per lactation of 200 days, excluding the first 30 days.
