= BMW Garmisch =

- The official replica of the Garmisch created by BMW in 2019

Overview
- Also called: BMW 2002 Ti Garmisch
- Production: 1970 (original); 2019 (official replica)
- Designer: Marcello Gandini at Bertone

Body and chassis
- Class: Concept car
- Body style: 2-door coupé
- Related: BMW 2002 Tii

The BMW Garmisch is a concept car designed and built by Bertone on the chassis of a BMW 2002 Tii. The car debuted in 1970 at the Geneva Motor Show.

== History ==
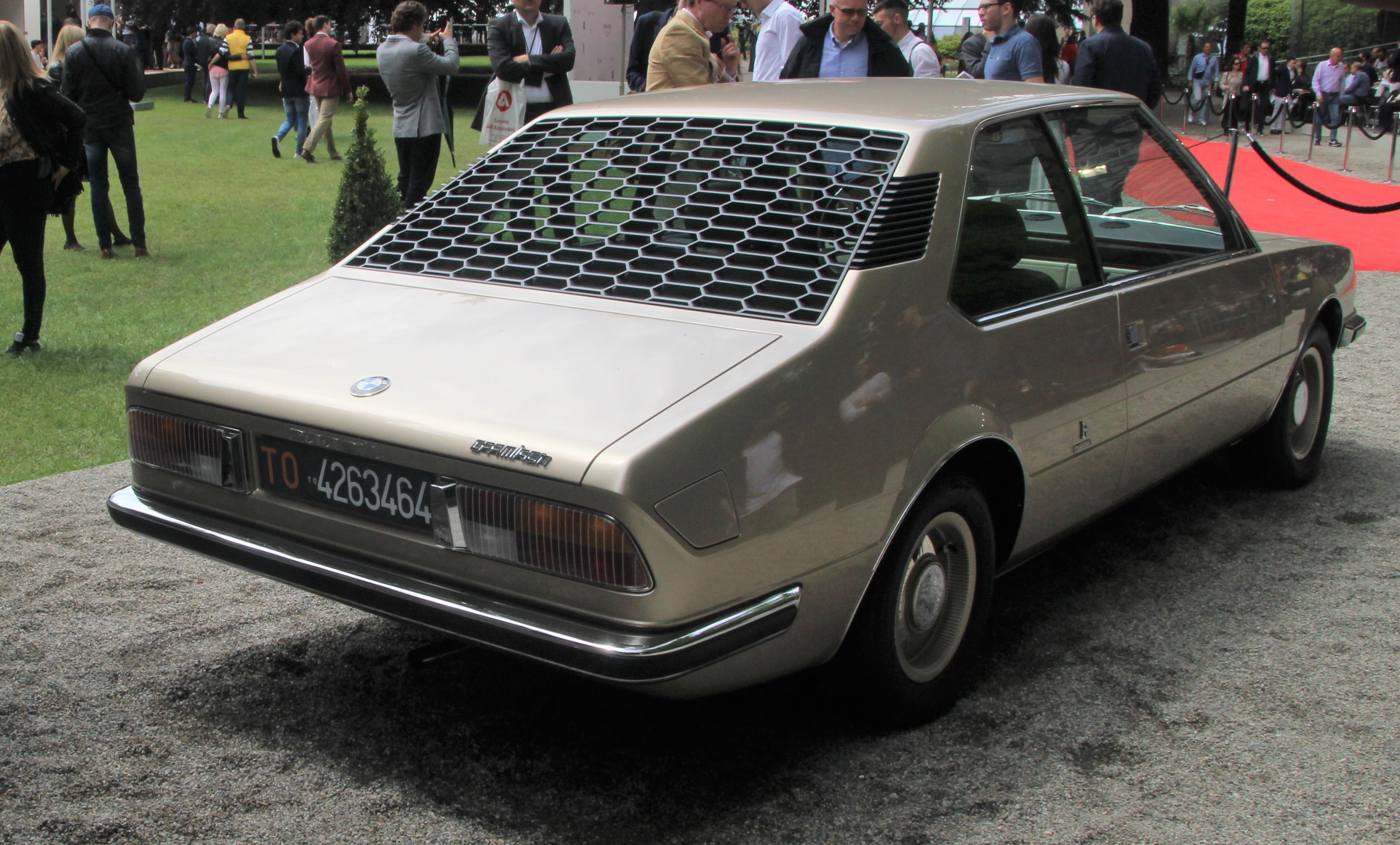
Rear view of the Garmisch replica

Designed by Marcello Gandini for Bertone, the Garmisch was built in 1969 on the basis of a BMW 2002 Tii. The concept was not commissioned by BMW, but rather was an independent design proposal intended to showcase Bertone’s creativity and surprise BMW upon its debut, further strengthening the relationship between the two companies. The car, named after the Garmisch ski resort, was built in a few months; Nuccio Bertone entrusted the task to Gandini, whom he commanded to create a car to replace the BMW 1602 that was faithful to BMW’s design language while looking futuristic and featuring design elements which broke from the BMW designs of the time (which were characterized by round lines). Initially, BMW objected when they found out Bertone planned to reveal the Garmisch at the 1970 Geneva show, due to the E21 3 Series still being years away from production, but eventually they gave permission.

Starting from a 2002 Tii, Gandini changed the proportions of the vehicle, lengthening the front and rear hoods and lowering the car. As a whole, the style differed from the BMWs of the time, with an angular, futuristic aesthetic. The exterior was characterized by angular lines, with square and glass covered front headlights, double hexagonal kidney grilles, and a honeycomb mesh design over the rear window.

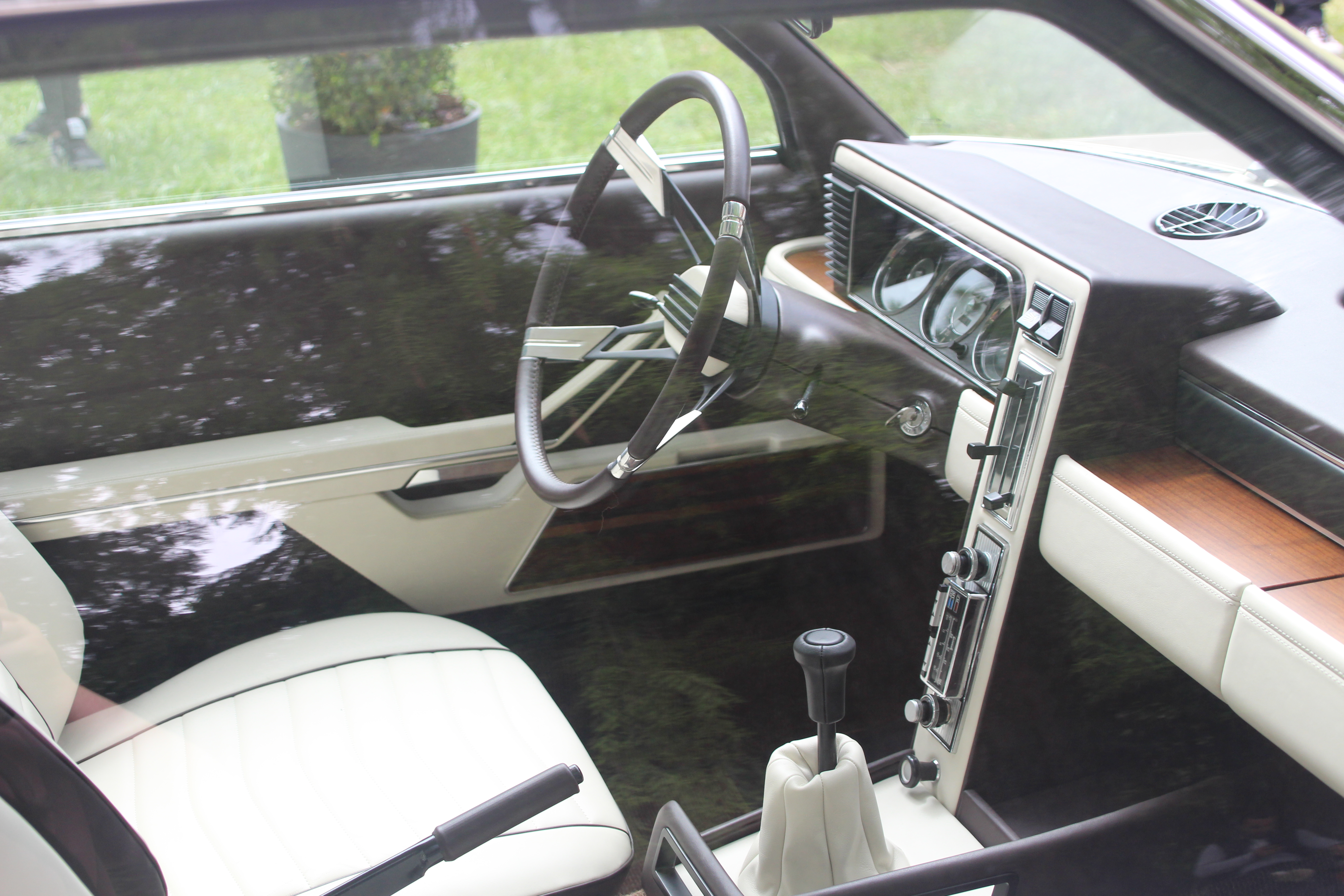
Interior of the Garmisch replica

The interior featured a center console equipped with a vertically oriented radio, and a storage compartment placed in front of the passenger that, when opened, contained a large retractable mirror. Many of the interior surfaces were upholstered in champagne-colored leather, recalling the light champagne color of the exterior.

After being presented at the Geneva Motor Show, and making a few appearances at other motor shows in 1970, the car returned to the BMW headquarters in Munich, but the vehicle disappeared. It's unknown what happened to the original Garmisch.

The Garmisch had an influence on the style of subsequent BMW models, with its departure from the round styles that had characterized the brand’s designs until then. In particular, it influenced the design of the first generation of the 5 Series (E12) in 1972 and the first generation of the 3 Series (E21) in 1975.

== Recreation ==
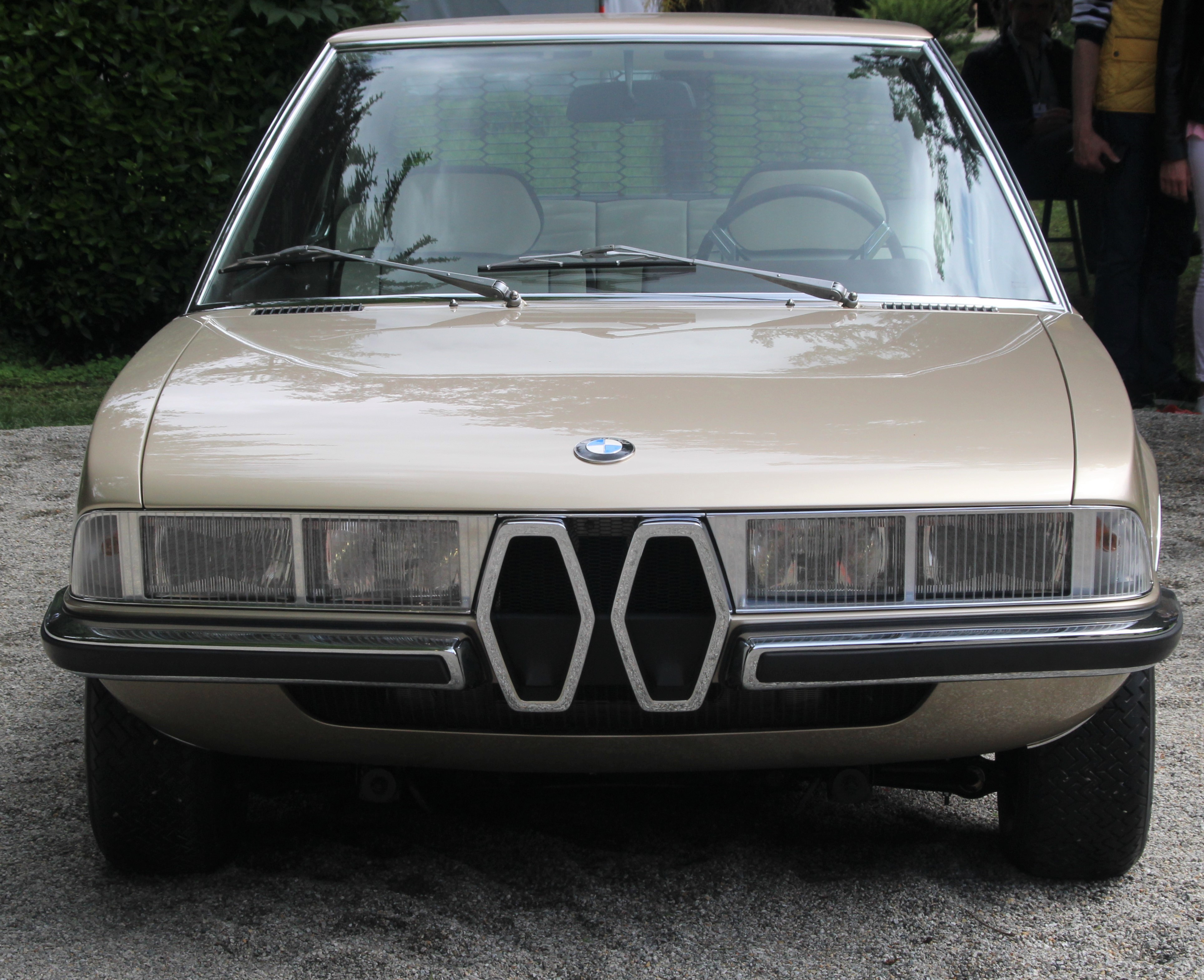
Front end of the Garmisch replica

Around fifty years after its introduction, BMW decided to recreate the Garmisch as faithfully as possible to the original. So, in the summer of 2018, BMW’s head of design Adrian van Hooydonk contacted Gandini to ask for his approval and see if he wanted to participate in the project, to which Gandini said yes. Since the original plans and designs were lost, the team used vintage photographs, Gandini’s memories of the car, and a 3D computer modeled reconstruction to recreate the Garmisch. Then, in collaboration with Turin coachbuilder Superstile, they built a second example of the Garmisch using an old 2002 Tii as a base. The new car was fully functional and featured bodywork made by beating the sheetmetal panels by hand like the original. It debuted at the Villa d'Este Elegance Competition in May 2019, and was then transferred to the BMW Museum.
