= Bagnolese =

Breed of sheep

- Conservation status: FAO (2007): endangered-maintained
- Country of origin: Italy
- Distribution: province of Avellino; province of Benevento; province of Salerno
- Standard: MIPAAF
- Use: dual-purpose, milk and meat

Traits
- Weight: Male: 90 kg; Female: 68 kg
- Skin colour: unpigmented
- Wool colour: white
- Face colour: mottled
- Horn status: males often horned

The Bagnolese is an Italian breed of domestic sheep from the area surrounding Bagnoli Irpino in the province of Avellino, in Campania in southern Italy. It takes its name from that of the town. It is raised principally in Irpinia, in the Monti Picentini, in the Monti Alburni, in the Piana del Sele and in the Vallo di Diano. It probably derives from the Barbaresca breed, and may also have been influenced by the Comisana. It is one of the forty-two autochthonous local sheep breeds of limited distribution for which a herd-book is kept by the Associazione Nazionale della Pastorizia, the Italian national association of sheep-breeders.

In 2013 total numbers for the breed were 13538.
