= Lamborghini P140 =

Series of prototype cars built by Italian car maker Lamborghini

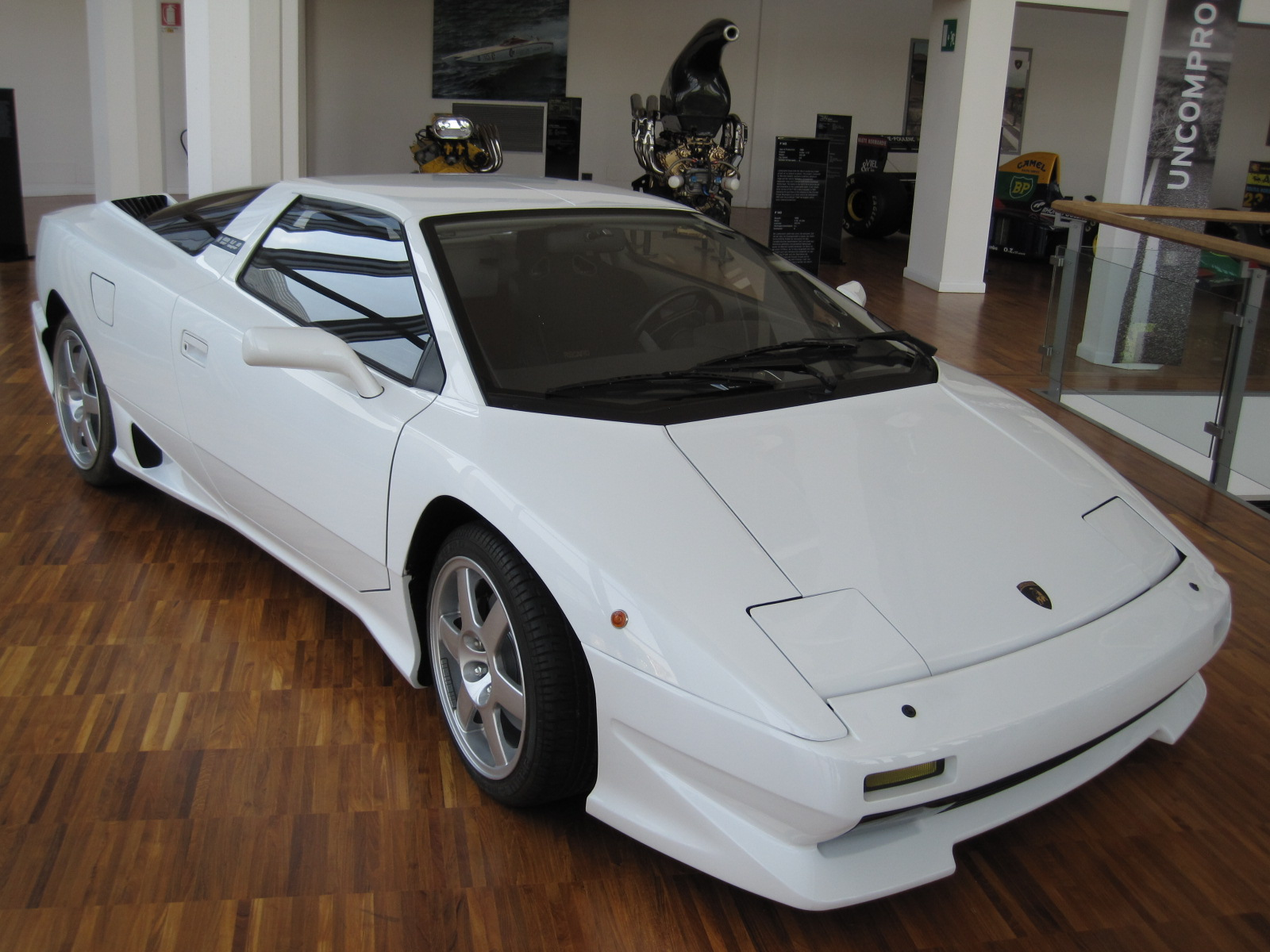
- The third Lamborghini P140 prototype on display at the Lamborghini Museum

Overview
- Manufacturer: Automobili Lamborghini S.p.A.
- Production: 1987; 3 or 4 prototypes made
- Designer: Marcello Gandini

Body and chassis
- Class: Development prototype
- Body style: 2-door coupé
- Layout: Rear mid-engine, rear-wheel-drive
- Related: Lamborghini Cala

Powertrain
- Engine: 4.0 L V10
- Transmission: 6-speed manual

The Lamborghini P140 is a code name given to a series of prototype cars built by Lamborghini starting in 1987. It was intended as a replacement for the outgoing Jalpa but never went into production, despite being close to production ready. This was due to dwindling demand for high performance during the recession caused by the 1990 oil price shock and 1990-1991 Gulf War. The P140 was the first Lamborghini to be powered by a V10 engine.

== History ==
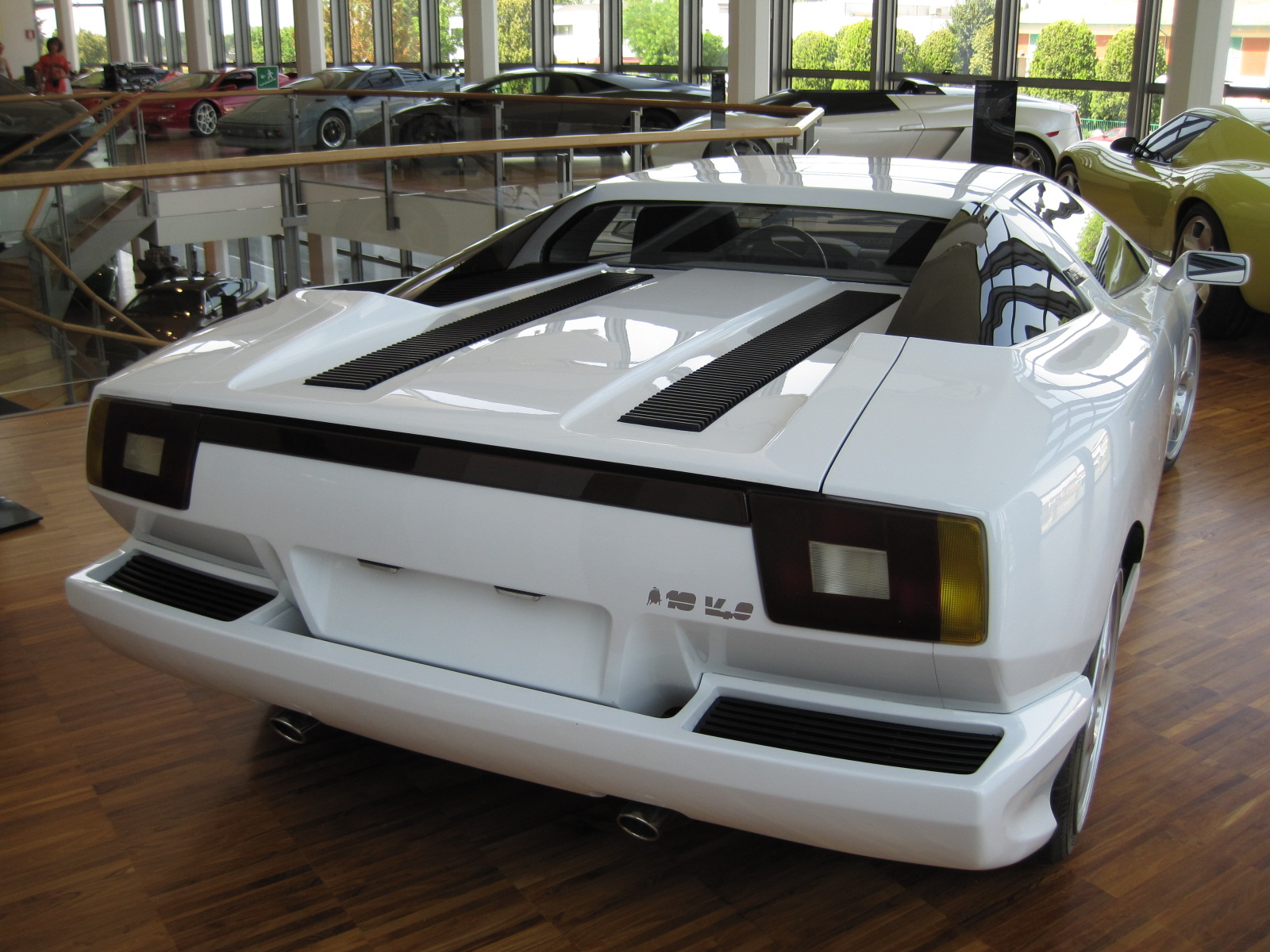
Rear view

In the late 1980s, Lamborghini made plans to replace the aging Countach and Jalpa. While the development of the company's V12 powered flagship model had already started, work was undertaken in order to start development of the new entry-level model. The design work of the new model was once again contracted to famed Italian designer Marcello Gandini who had worked closely with Lamborghini previously. The wedge shaped 2-door coupé codenamed the P140 penned by Gandini was immediately recognised as a member of the Lamborghini family and was powered by an entirely new 4.0-litre V10 engine along with an ergonomic dashboard and an extensive use of aluminium in the construction of the car. Development of the model continued into the 1990s before the company's then owner Chrysler ultimately decided that the model would not be able to justify its development costs and garner much interest among customers due to the on going Gulf Oil Crisis of the 1990s which led to a fall in sales of high performance sports cars. The model was shelved in the final stages of its development but later on, the same engine and transmission used in the P140 would appear in the Giugiaro designed Calà concept introduced at the 1995 Geneva Motor Show.

The Calà completely deviated from the wedge-themed design of the P140 and introduced a new curvaceous designed body made from carbon-fibre with innovative features such as a targa top design. The increased customer interest once again encouraged Lamborghini to develop a model to fill in the void left by the Jalpa but once again, the lack of funds needed for development meant that the concept once again needed to be shelved. It wasn't until 2002 until finally the Gallardo with an evolution of the V10 engine used in the P140 would be introduced as the new entry-level model of the brand and would be highly successful in terms of sales.

== Production ==
3 to 4 P140 prototypes are known to have been built according to company records. The first one was painted orange and was fully functional, hitting a top speed of 295 km/h (183 mph) on the Nardò Ring in Italy. The second prototype was painted red but was just a rolling chassis and was never fitted with an engine, and the third, built in 1991-1992, was painted white. The third car ended up being crashed during testing but was later restored and is currently on display at Lamborghini's official museum in Sant'Agata Bolognese, Italy.

In addition to the prototypes which wore Gandini designed bodywork, multiple styling models showcasing other possible designs for the upcoming model were built, including a proposal by Chrysler’s Design Center, and one by Bertone.

== Performance ==
The P140 is powered by a mid-mounted, fuel-injected 4.0-litre V10 engine which sends power to the rear wheels through a 6-speed manual transmission. The engine was Lamborghini's first ever 10 cylinder engine and it produced a power output of 370 PS (272 kW; 365 hp). The P140 is capable of accelerating from 0–100 km/h (0–62 mph) in around five seconds. The same V10 engine later appeared in the Calà concept which was introduced in 1995.
