= BMW 02 Series =

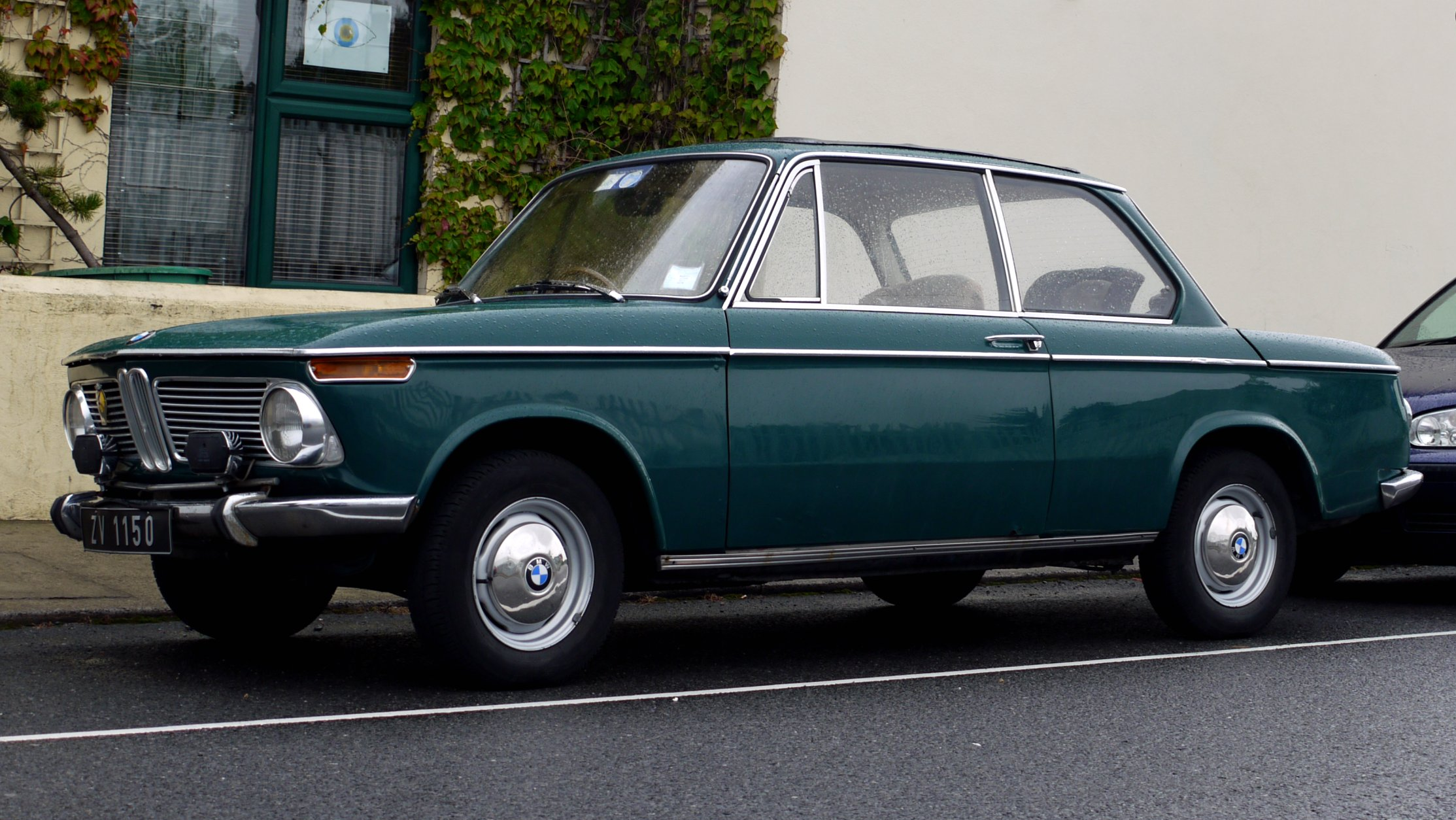
- BMW 1600-2

Overview
- Manufacturer: BMW
- Production: 1966–1977; 837,038 units
- Assembly: West Germany: Munich; Uruguay: Montevideo (Convex S.A.)
- Designer: Georg Bertram, Manfred Rennen, Giovanni Michelotti

Body and chassis
- Class: Compact executive car (D)
- Body style: 2-door coupé 2-door convertible 3-door hatchback
- Layout: FR layout

Powertrain
- Engine: 1573 cc M10 I4 (1502, 1602); 1766 cc M10 I4 (1802); 1990 cc M10 I4 (2002); 1990 cc M10 turbo I4 (2002 Turbo)
- Transmission: 4-speed manual 5-speed manual 3-speed automatic

Dimensions
- Wheelbase: 2,500 mm (98.4 in)
- Length: 4,220–4,230 mm (166.1–166.5 in)
- Width: 1,590–1,620 mm (62.6–63.8 in)
- Height: 1,360–1,410 mm (53.5–55.5 in)
- Curb weight: 940–1,080 kg (2,072–2,381 lb)

Chronology
- Successor: BMW 3 Series (E21)

The BMW 02 Series is a range of sporty compact executive cars produced by German automaker BMW between 1966 and 1977, based on a shortened version of the New Class Sedans.

The first 02 Series produced was the 1600-2 (later renamed 1602) in 1966. In 1975, the 02 Series was replaced by the E21 3 Series (except for the 1502 model, which continued until 1977).

== Overview ==
In the mid-1960s BMW perceived a market for a smaller, more affordable, two-door version of its four-door New Class executive sedan. Corporate design director Wilhelm Hofmeister assigned the project to staffers Georg Bertram and Manfred Rennen, who produced an attractive and sporty car 5 cm (2 in) shorter in wheelbase and some 25 cm (10 in) shorter in length, mainly by shortening the rear deck. The resulting 1966 production 1600-2 was less well-appointed than the New Class, but lighter, faster, and better handling.

The larger displacement 2002 directly derived from it in 1968 would go on to establish a new reputation for BMW as a maker of high-quality affordable performance vehicles.

Cabriolet, targa, hatchback, and economy versions of various "02" Series models were also produced.

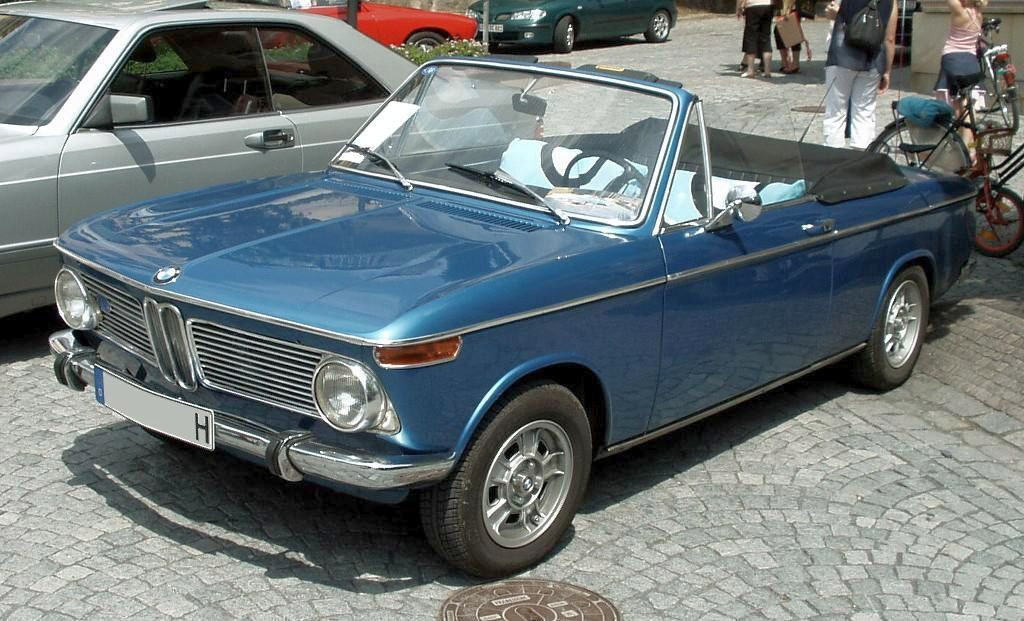
BMW 1600 Cabriolet

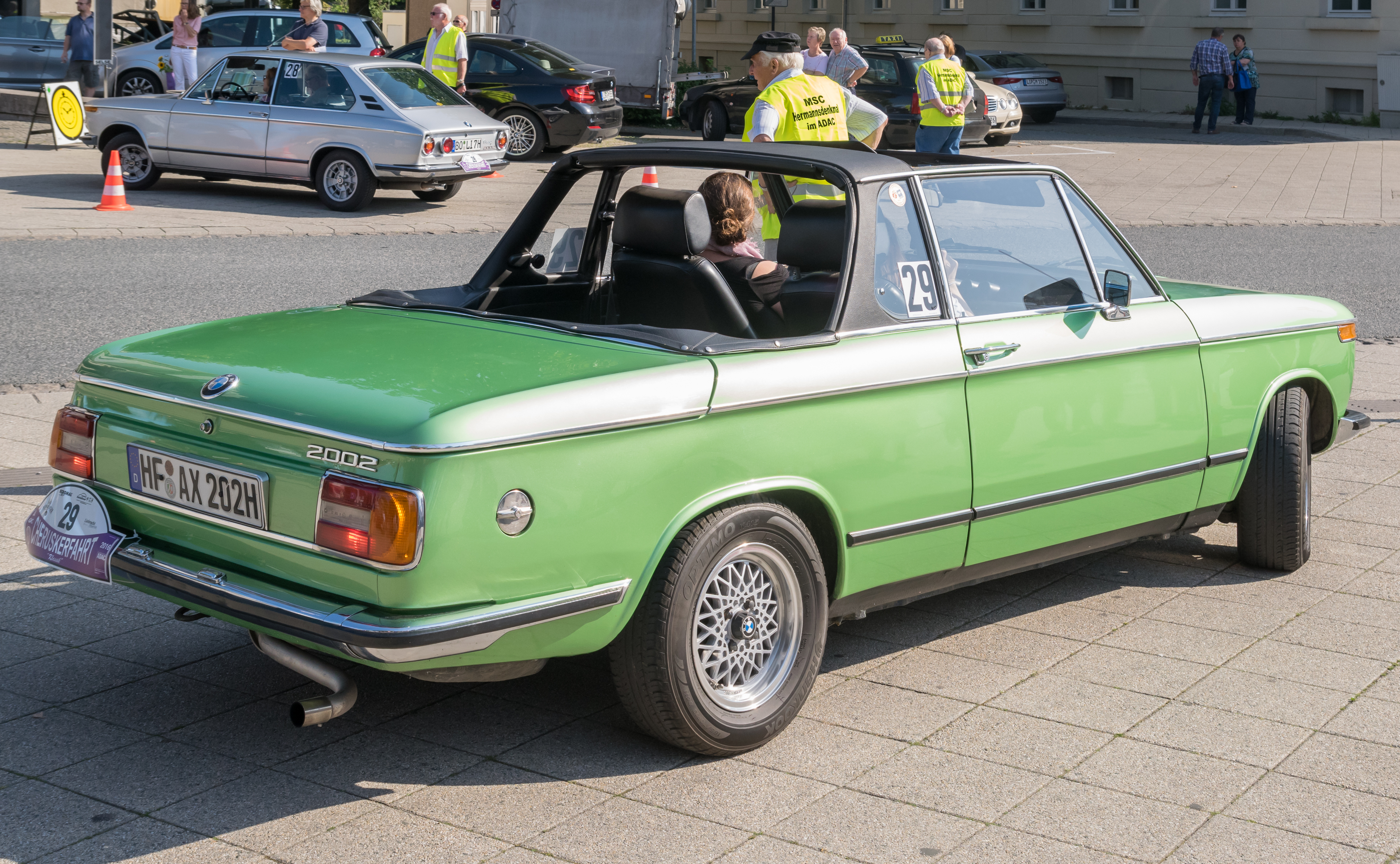
BMW 2002 Baur Top Cabriolet (Type 114C)

BMW 2000 Touring (the original Touring model eschewed the "02" suffix)

== 1600-2 / 1602 ==
The 1600-2 (the "-2" meaning "2-door") made its debut at the Geneva Motor Show in March 1966 and was sold through 1975, with the designation being simplified to "1602" in 1971. The badging on the 1600-2 read simply "1600". The 1.6 L M10 engine produced 85 PS (63 kW; 84 hp) at 5,700 rpm and 130 N⋅m (96 lb⋅ft) at 3,500 rpm. In 1968, Road & Track declared the US$2676 1600 "a great automobile for the price".

The 1600-2 became quickly popular in Western Europe, exception being Italy, where the 85 CV car available only with two doors with a 1.4 million lire price was not competitive against four-door alternatives, such as the Fiat 125 and the Alfa Romeo Giulia 1300 ti and Super.

A high performance version, the 1600 TI, was introduced in September 1967. With a compression ratio of 9.5:1 and the dual Solex PHH side-draft carburettor system from the 1800 TI, the 1600 TI produced 105 PS (77 kW; 104 hp) at 6,000 rpm. Kerb weight for the 1600 TI is 960 kg (2,116 lb). Once the 2-liter 2002 arrived, the 1600 TI was immediately discontinued. The 1600 TI was not sold in the United States, as it did not meet the federal emission standards.

Also introduced in September 1967 was a limited-production cabriolet, which would be produced by Baur. The original design was a full convertible; after 1971 this was replaced by a targa-top model with fixed window frames called a "top cabriolet" (commonly referred to as a cabrio coach). A hatchback, called the Touring model, was developed from the 02 body, being available from 1971. Only 25,827 Touring models were sold before the body style was discontinued in 1974.

== 2002 ==
Helmut Werner Bönsch, BMW's director of product planning, and Alex von Falkenhausen, designer of the company’s M10 engine, each independently had a two-litre version of the M10 installed in a 1600-2 for their personal use. When they realized they had both made the same modification to their own cars, they prepared a joint proposal to BMW's board to manufacture a two-litre version of the 1600-2. At the same time, American importer Max Hoffman was asking BMW for a sportier version of the 02 series that could be sold in the United States.

As per the larger coupé and four-door sedan models, the 2.0 engine was initially sold in two states of tune: the base single-carburetor 2002 producing 100 PS (74 kW; 99 hp) and the dual-carburetor high compression 2002 ti producing 120 PS (88 kW; 118 hp). The 2002 Automatic, with the base engine and a ZF 3HP12 3 speed automatic transmission, became available in 1969. The 2002 ti was replaced in 1971 by the 2002 tii, which used the fuel-injected 130 PS (96 kW; 128 hp) engine from the 2000 tii, delivering a top speed of 185 km/h (115 mph).

In 1971, the Baur cabriolet was switched from the 1.6 L engine to the 2.0 L engine to become the 2002 TopCabriolet, a cabrio coach with a large rollbar and fixed window frames which continued to be available well into 1975. In 1978 Baur presented a TopCabriolet version of the succeeding 3-series as well. The Touring version of the 02 Series became available with all engine sizes at the time, including the tii (of which only 422 examples were made). A 2002 tii Touring model was available throughout the run of the tii engine and the Touring body, both of which ended production in 1974.

The 2002 turbo (E20) was launched at the 1973 Frankfurt Motor Show. This was Europe's and BMW's first turbocharged production car. It produced 170 PS (125 kW; 168 hp) at 5,800 rpm, with 240 N⋅m (177 lbf⋅ft) of torque. The car had a top speed of 211 km/h (131 mph). The 2002 Turbo used the 2002 tii engine with a twin-scroll 0.55 Bar turbocharger developed together with KK&K. The cylinder head was a modified version of the '121TI' design (used on 1972 & earlier 2002s) with larger combustion chambers to give a compression ratio of 6.9:1, in order to prevent engine knocking. A version of the Kugelfischer mechanical fuel injection was used with integrated boost enrichment feature and altitude compensation. The car had a larger radiator and an oil cooler as standard, front brakes were a ventilated derivative of the tii brake and rear drums were a 250mm design that would later appear on the E21 3-series. The gearbox was either a strengthened Getrag 232 4-speed (unique to the 2002 turbo) or the Getrag 235/5 close-ratio 5 speed (which was also optional on 2002 tii), this drove through a 3.36:1 limited-slip differential to 5.5J13 steel wheels of a similar design to those that would appear later on the E21. The interior added an extra gauge cluster for the boost gauge & clock plus a red instrument panel with 240kmh/150 mph speedometer, sports seats & steering wheel. The steel body featured a different front-panel with additional tow-bracket and air-intake apertures and the front and rear wheel arches are cut-back to allow fitting of wider wheels. These body changes are clothed in fibreglass wheelarch extensions and a front airdam, all bolted to the body, plus a rubber rear spoiler on the trunk lid. Two standard colours were available: Chamonix (white) and Polaris (silver) - and cars featured BMW motorsport colour-scheme stripes/decals on the sides & front airdam. The 2002 Turbo was introduced just before the 1973 oil crisis, therefore only 1,672 were built, as BMW has since said "BMW had built a car that contradicted the spirit of the times like no automobile before".

At the Paris Motor Show in 1969, BMW unveiled a fastback 2002 GT4 concept car. This model never reached production.

BMW 2002 (rear)

BMW 2002 ti

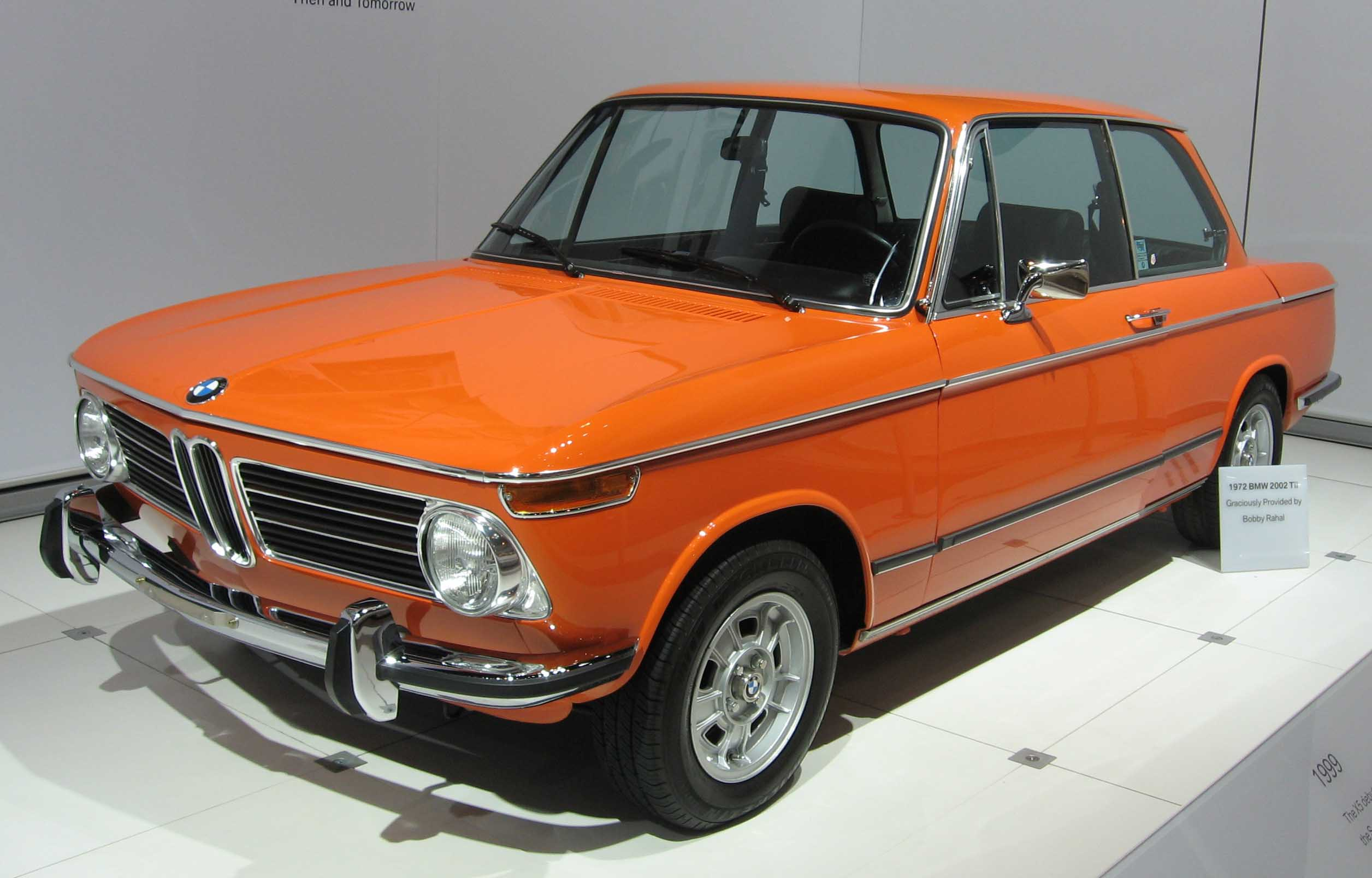
BMW 2002 tii

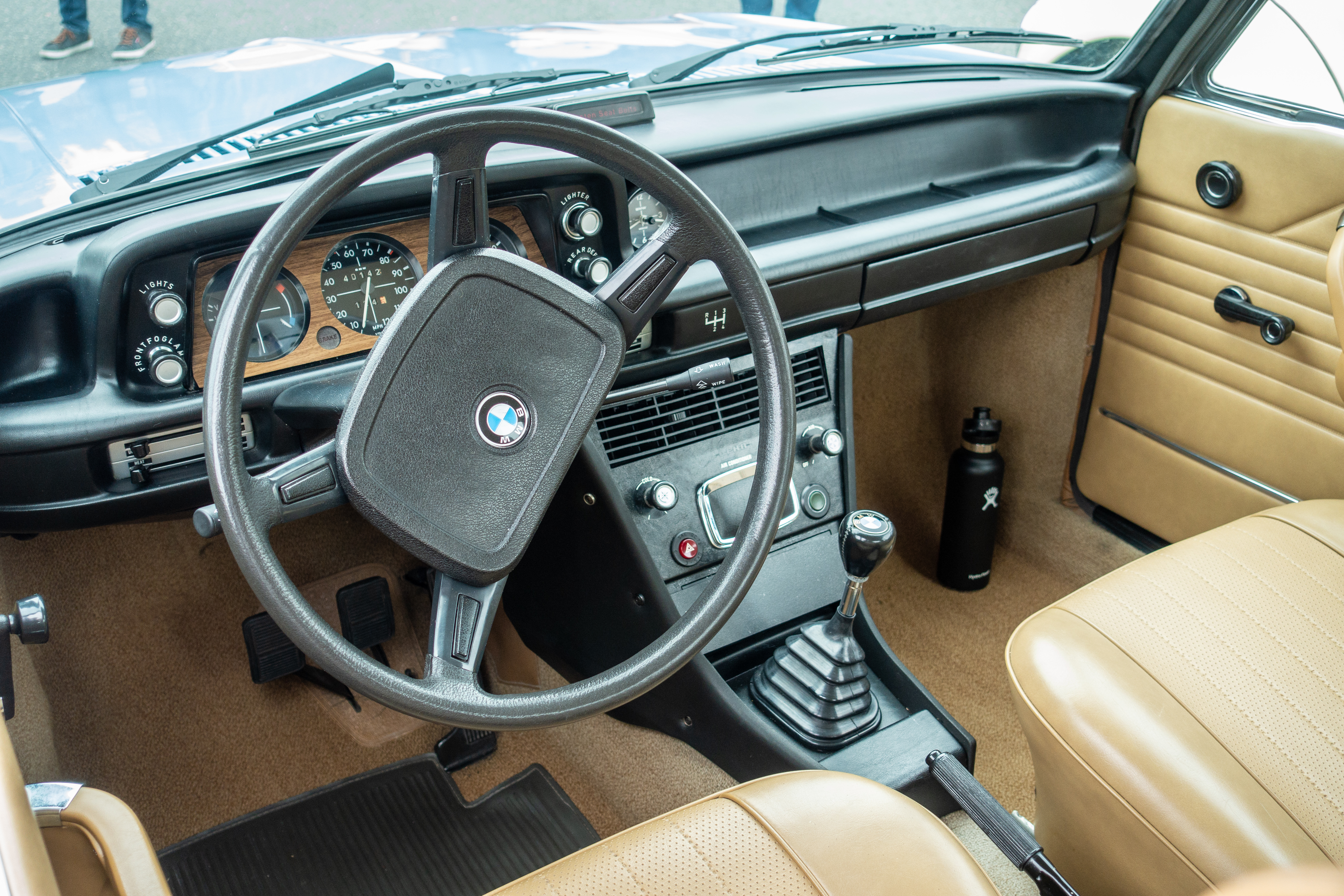
BMW 2002 tii interior

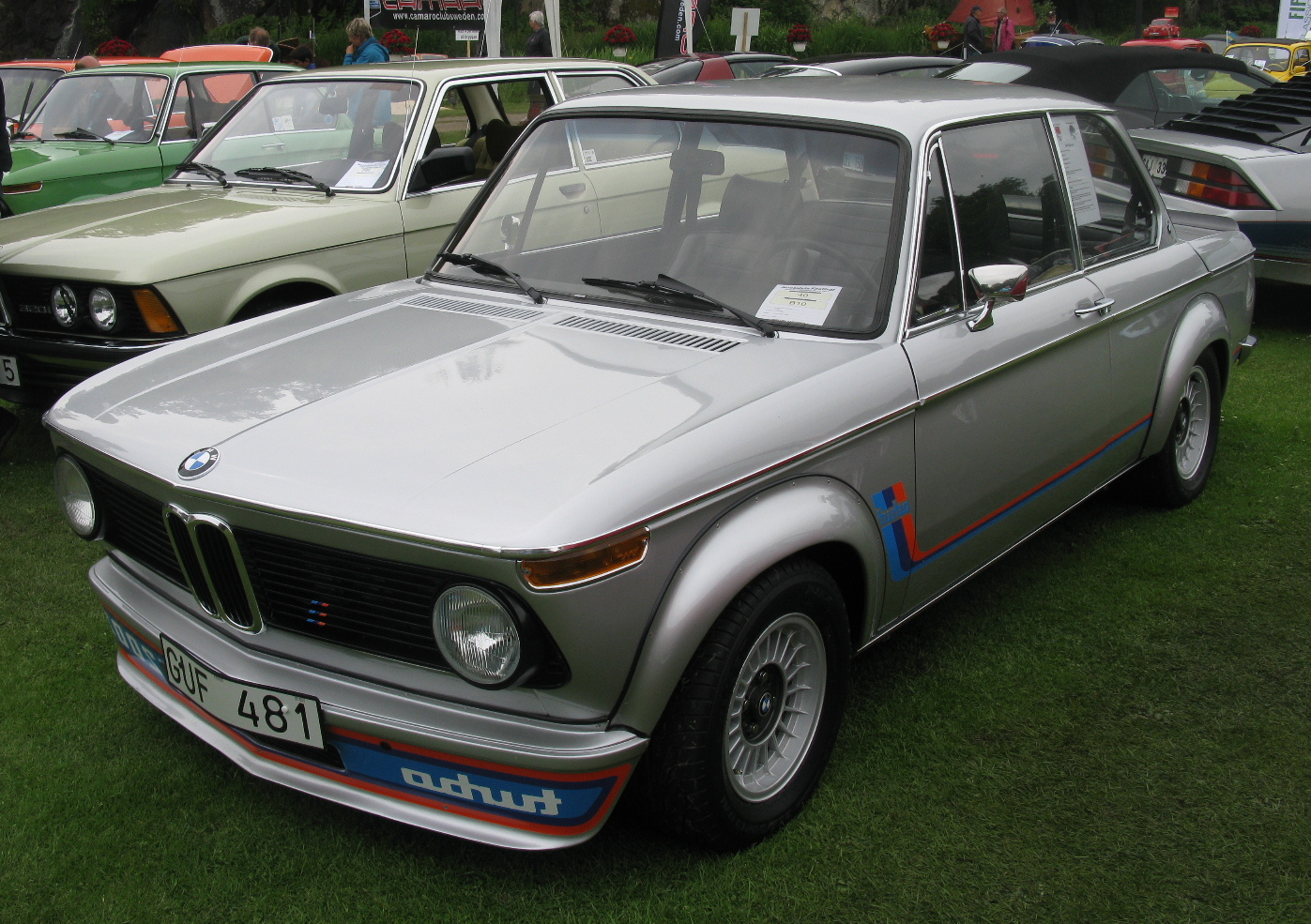
BMW 2002 Turbo

== 1802 ==
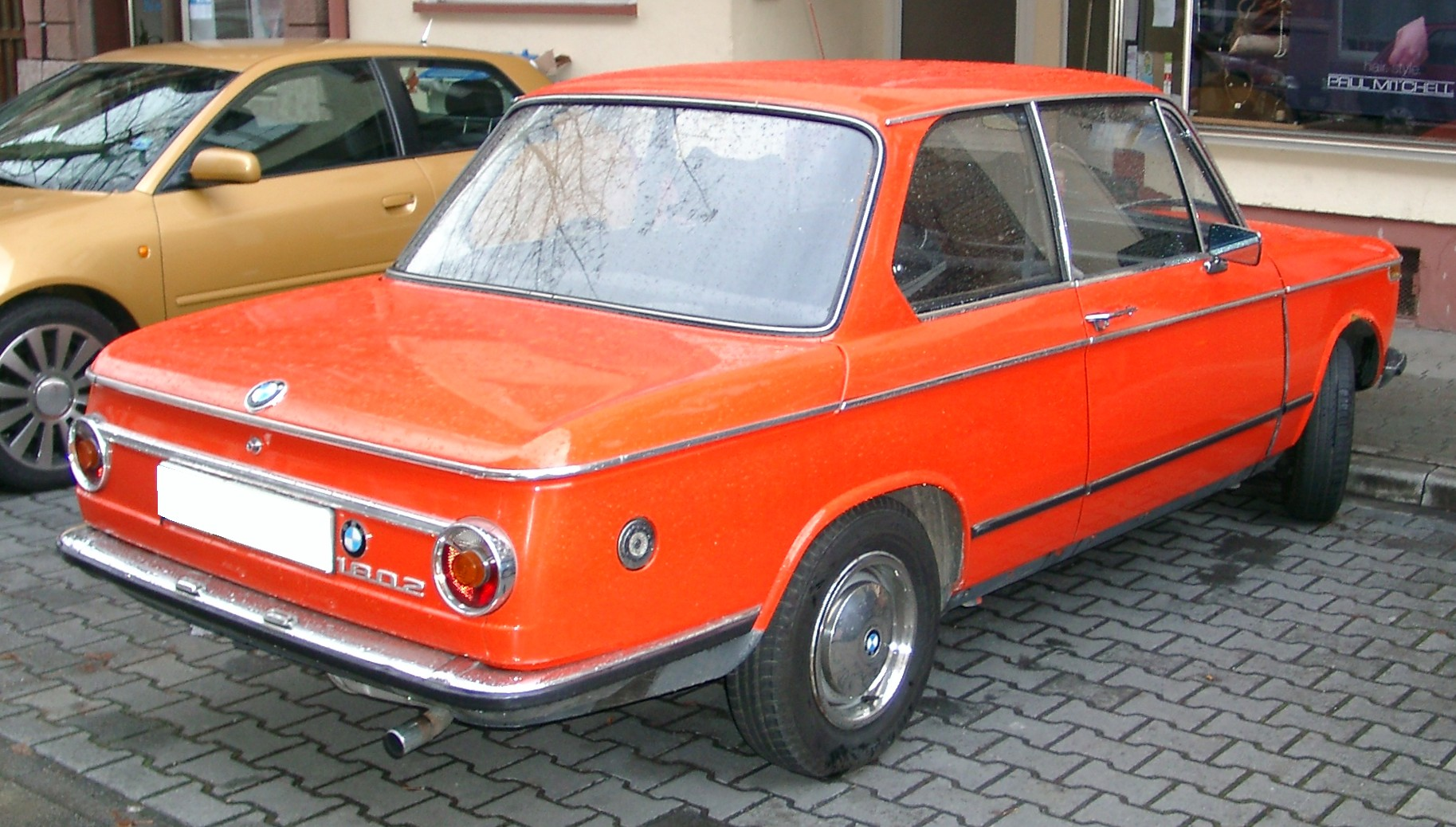
BMW 1802

The 1802 was introduced in 1971 and was available with either the original 2-door sedan body or the 3-door Touring hatchback introduced that year. Power from the 1.8-liter engine is 90 PS (66 kW; 89 hp) at 5250 rpm. Production of the Touring model continued until 1974, with the 1802 sedan ending production the following year.

== 1502 ==
The 1502, an economy model able to run on cheaper low-octane regular gas, was introduced in 1975 in response to increased gasoline prices resulting from global petroleum shortage. It had the same 1573 cc engine displacement as the 1602, but a lower 8.0:1. compression ratio reduced power to 75 PS (55 kW; 74 hp).

While the rest of the 02 Series was replaced in 1975 by the E21 3 Series, the 1502 continued until 1977.

== Yearly changes ==
=== 1968 January ===
Production of the 2002 for the European market begins with VIN 1650001.

=== 1968 February ===
Production for the US market begins with VIN 1660001. A few early production models were assembled in the third quarter of 1967 for emissions testing and as press pool cars. Approximately 2,850 were built by the end of the model year production in September 1968. These models complied with US DOT regulations implemented at the beginning of 1968.

=== 1971 ===
In 1971, the 02 Series received a facelift. The 3-door hatchback "Touring" body style (initially badged "2000") and the 1802 model were introduced as part of the facelift. The 2002ti was replaced by the 2002tii. Other changes included wraparound bumpers for all models, a 2-piece instrument cluster, and new seats.

=== 1973 ===
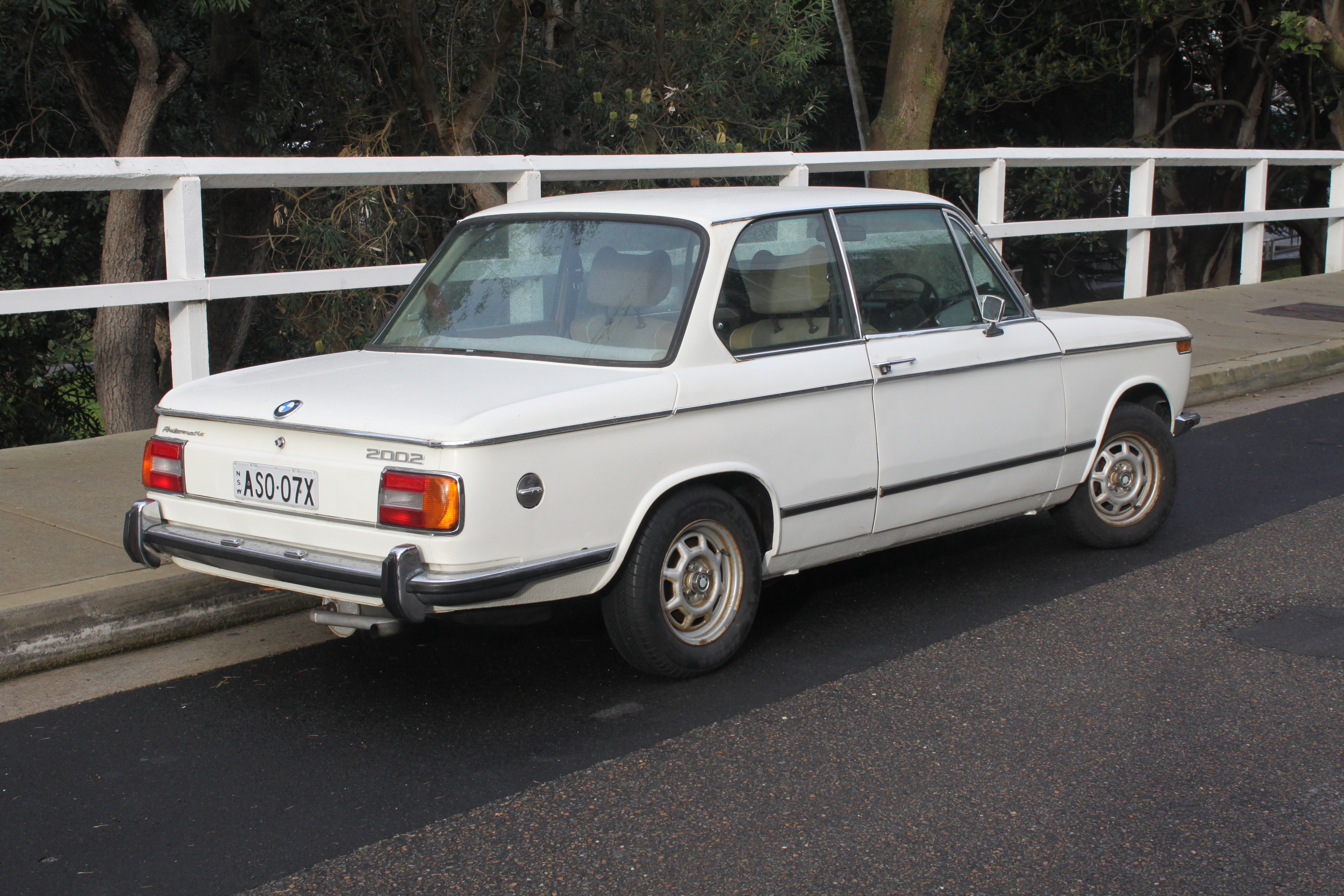
Facelifted 2002 automatic

Exterior trim changes, including revised tail-lights (except for Touring models and in the United States, which maintained round tail lights, US models received the revisions for the 1974 model year), grille and kidney trim.

=== 1975 ===
The 1502 is introduced as the base model.

== Special models ==
=== 2002 ti Diana ===
To celebrate the marriage of racer Hubert Hahne to Diana Körner, twelve custom 2002 ti models were built with changes including twin headlights (from the 2800 CS) a leather interior and Italian aluminium wheels. Each of the twelve cars were painted in a different colour. There are only four known remaining 2002 ti Diana.

=== 1602 Elektro ===
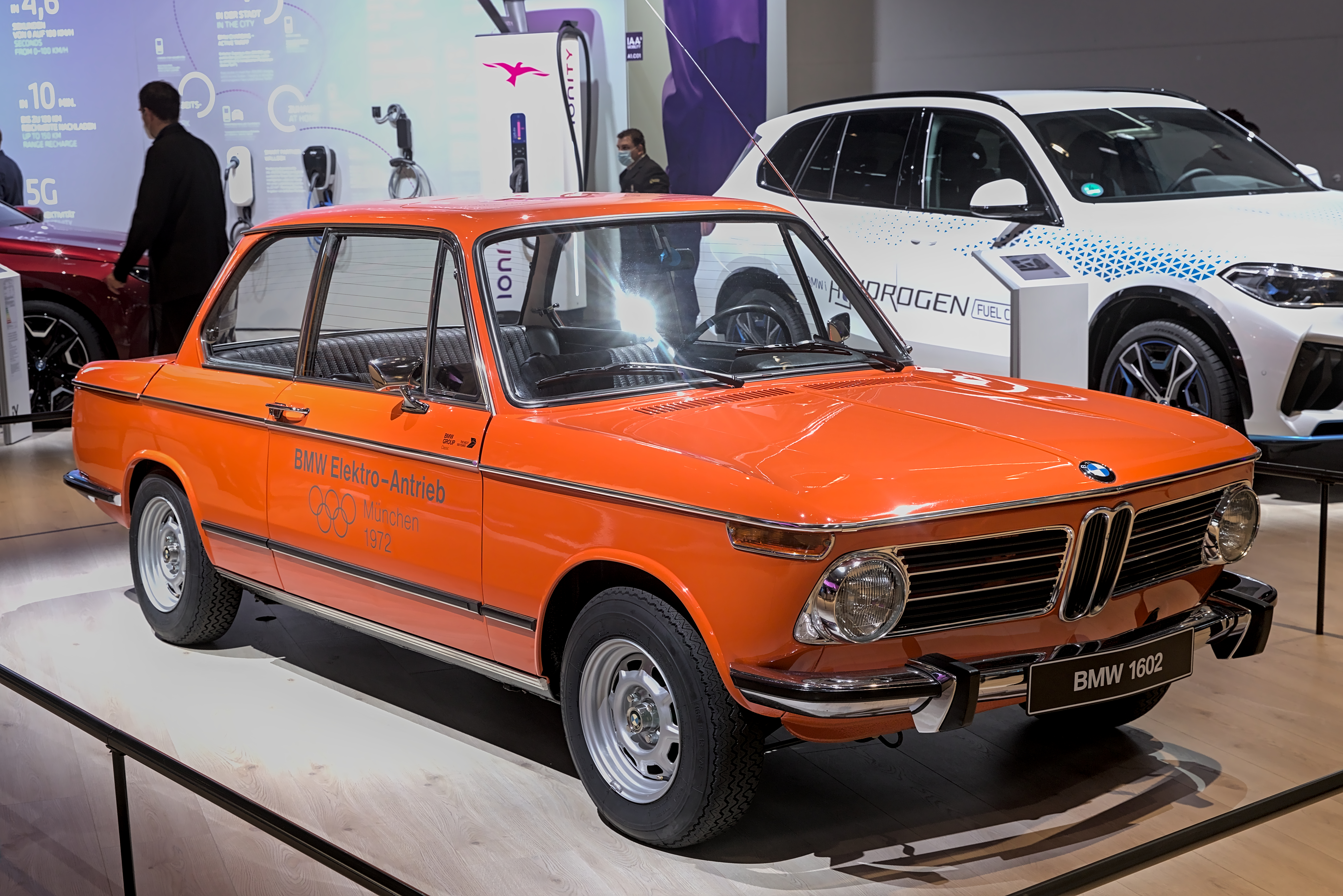
BMW 1602 Elektro

For the 1972 Olympic Games in Munich, Germany, BMW developed the "1602 Elektro" electric-powered concept vehicle, its first electric car. Two vehicles were produced, and in addition to shuttling VIPs, they served as a support vehicle of the long-distance walkers and marathon runners during the games. The 350 kg (772 lb) pack of twelve lead-acid batteries (located under the bonnet) gave a range of approximately 30 km (19 mi).

The 1602 Elektro-Antrieb used one 32 kW (43 hp) electric motor, front-mounted driving the rear axle. It has a claimed top speed of 100 km/h (62 mph) and acceleration of 0 to 30 mph (0 to 48 km/h) in 8.0 seconds.

==== Battery ====
The battery has a total capacity of 12.6 kWh electric vehicle battery these batteries can be charged or replaced with a freshly charged pack, the battery pack weighed 350 kg (772 lb).

=== 2002 GT4 ===
A special Frua-designed coupe body was developed on the basis of a 2002 Ti. Only two were produced in 1969/1970.

=== Garmisch ===
BMW Garmisch replica

At the 1970 Geneva Motor Show, Bertone presented a concept based on the chassis of a 2002 tii called the Garmisch. After appearing at a handful of motor shows, the car returned to BMW and subsequently disappeared. In 2018, BMW worked with the original designer, Marcello Gandini, as well as a Turin coachbuilder, to create a faithful recreation of the Garmisch, which they presented in 2019.

== Production in Uruguay ==
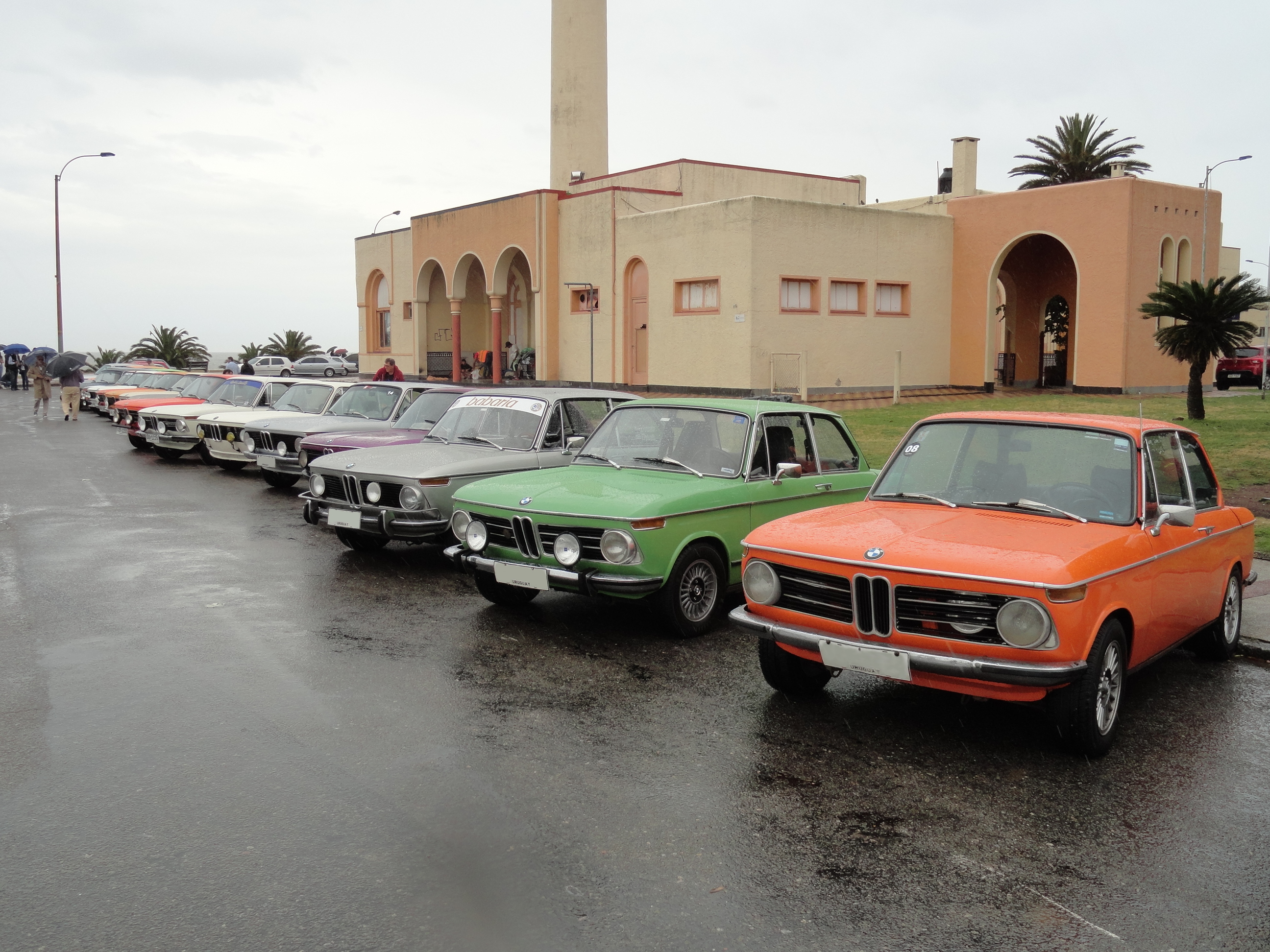
50th anniversary meeting in Uruguay

The 1600-2 and 2002 were assembled from CKD kits in Montevideo, Uruguay, under licence by Convex S.A. 58 initial kits for the 1600-2 were sent in 1967; this was replaced by the 2002 which started local assembly in 1969. A total of about 750 2002s were built there. The last batch of kits was sent in April 1973.

== Production figures ==
Model	Units
2002 (1968−1975)	339,092
2002 turbo (1973−1975)	1,672
2002 tii (1971−1975)	38,703
2000/2002 Touring (1971−1974)	15,969
2000/2002 tii Touring (1971−1974)	5,783
02 Series Cabriolet (1967−1975); 1600 Cabriolet (1967−1971); 2002 Baur Cabriolet (1971−1975)	4,199 (1,682) (2,517)
1802 (1971−1975)	83,351
1600/1600-2/1602 (1966−1975)	266,967
1600 TI (1967−1968)	8,670
1502 (1975−1977)	72,632

== Motorsport ==
According to the Racing Sportscars database, the BMW 2002 was used in competitive motorsport from 1968 to 1986, and 2002s were entered in 600 events. There were 2449 entries of cars at these 600 events, with 1520 finishes and 707 retirements (a finishing ratio of 68%). Overall event wins totaled 50 (with additional 53 class wins), 57 2nd places and 62 3rd-place finishes.

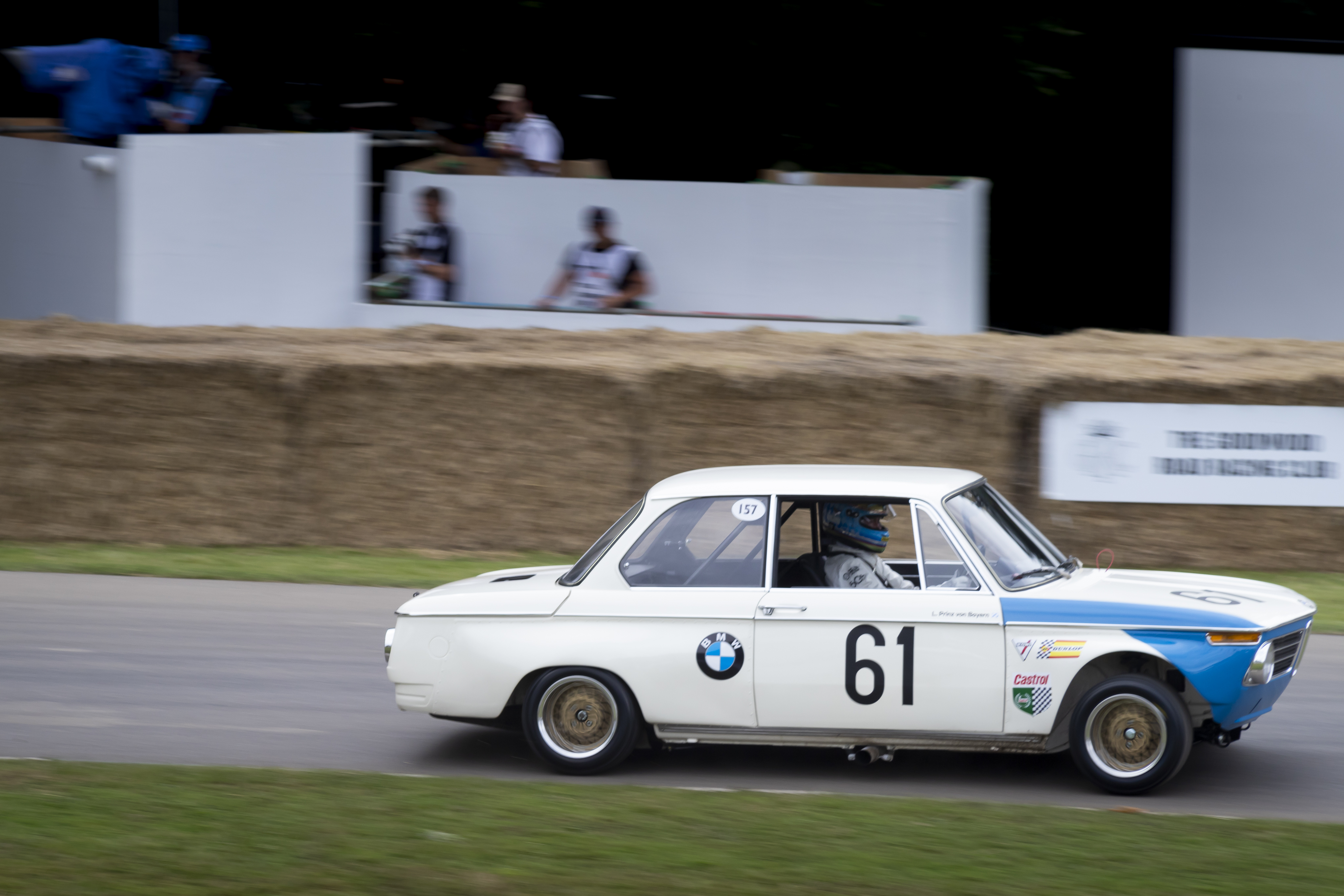
A 1969 BMW 2002 TiK at Goodwood Festival of Speed in 2024, driven by Leopold Prinz von Bayern.

Dieter Quester & Hubert Hahne won the June 1969 European Touring Car Race (ETCC) at Brand's Hatch, Kent, UK in a BMW 2002 TiK (the ~250BHP turbocharged factory-developed 2002 touring car)

The BMW 2002 competed in the Trans Am Series under two liter class, although it saw little success as the class was dominated by Alfa Romeo, Porsche, and Datsun. In the golden age of Trans Am (1966–1972), BMW only garnered two race wins (Bryar and Bridgehampton in 1970)

Liechtenstein engine-specialist Max Heidegger prepared a BMW 2002 TI with a F2 engine (capable of 260 bhp) for French privateer Daniel Brillat at the 1975 24 Hours of Le Mans, where the car finished the race, albeit last overall, having covered 252 laps, 85 less than the race-winning Mirage GR8.

Schnitzer Motorsport made a Group 5 version of the 2002 from 1974-1979, with big, wide, boxy wheel arches at the rear, which housed radiators mounted sideways, a wing, front splitter, side exhaust, & other modifications.

Specifications
Engine/car specs	
Engine type	Straight 4
Displacement	2.0 litres (1990 cc)
Transmission	5-speed manual
Torque	215 lb⋅ft (292 N⋅m) at 5500 rpm
Power	280 bhp (209 kW) at 8500 rpm
Weight	2,094 lb (950 kg)
Layout	Front-engine, rear-wheel-drive

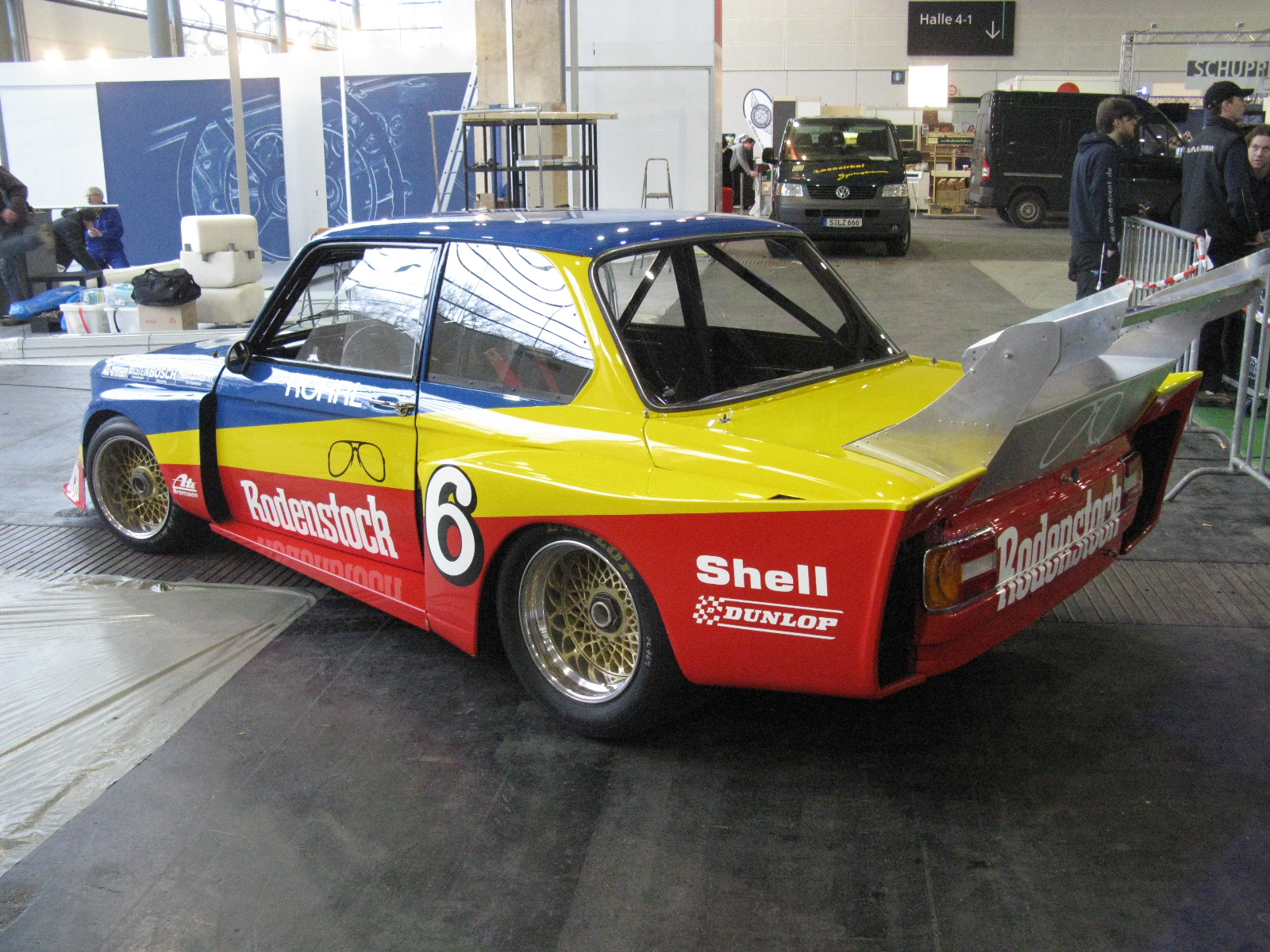
BMW 2002 Turbo Group 5 Schnitzer Motorsport rear side view

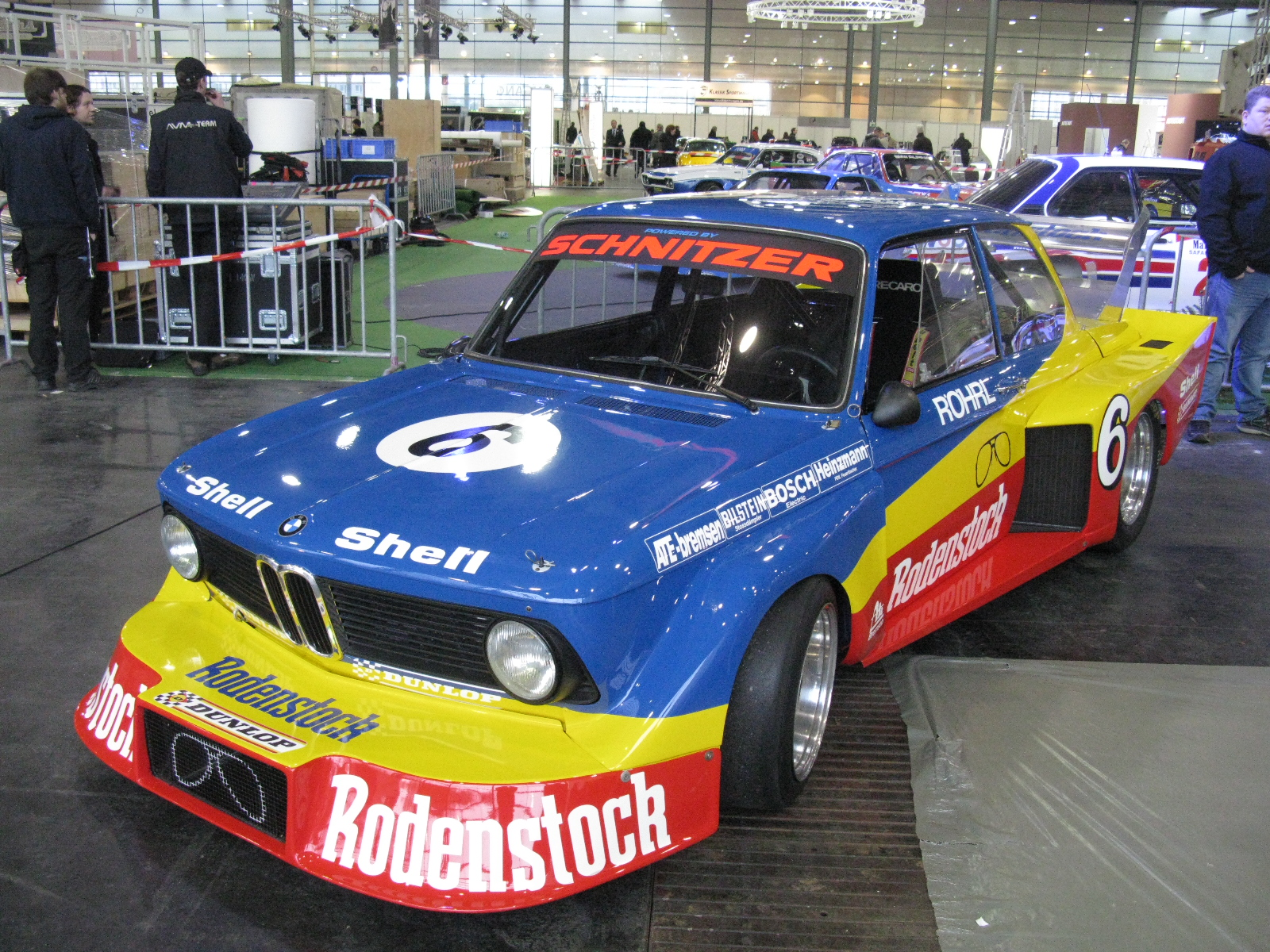
BMW 2002 Turbo Group 5 Schnitzer Motorsport front side view

Hans-Joachim Stuck and Clemens Schickentanz won the inaugural 1970 24 Hours Nürburgring driving a 2002.

Achim Warnbold teamed up with Jean Todt won the 1973 Austrian Rally 9th round of the inaugural World Rally Championship season with a 2002 Tii. But in the rally field, the greatest success of 2002TI was winning the European Rally Championship, which was achieved in 1971 by a Polish driver, Sobiesław Zasada (previously European Champion in 1966 and 1967). Second place was taken by Sandro Munari (later 1977 World Champion) on Lancia, and the third place was taken by the equally legendary Jean-Pierre Nicolas on an Alpine-Renault.

In Uruguay, the 2002 won the 1971 and 1973 Gran Premio 19 Capitales rally race and the 1972 6 Hours of El Pinar circuit race.

== Homages ==
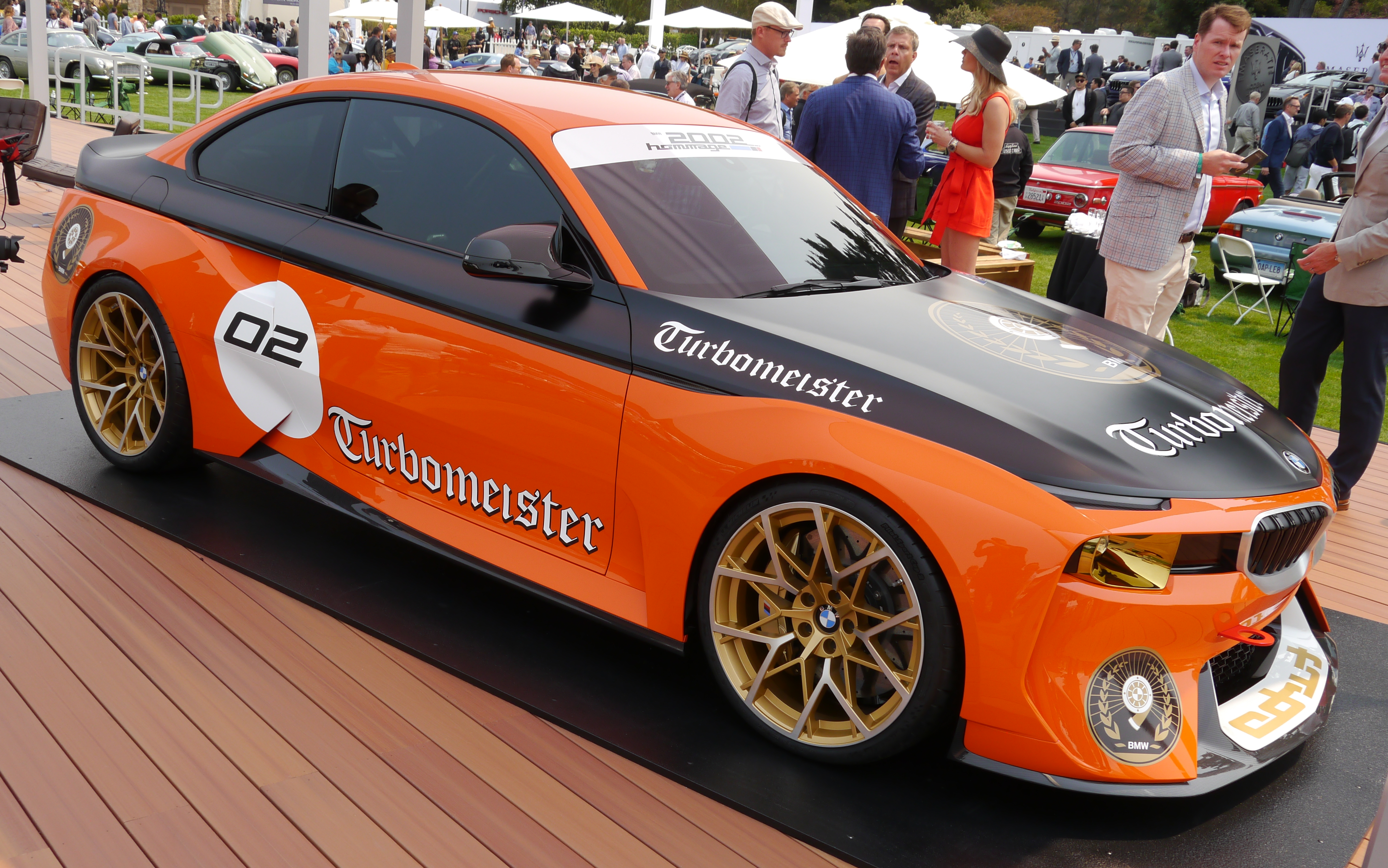
BMW 2002 Hommage Turbomeister

In 2015, BMW introduced a pair of concept cars paying tribute to the BMW 2002 turbo: the 2002 Hommage Concept and the 2002 Hommage Turbomeister Concept.
