= Leccese =

Breed of sheep

- Conservation status: FAO (2007): not at risk
- Other names: Moscia Leccese
- Country of origin: Italy
- Distribution: Salento peninsula
- Use: Triple-purpose, primarily for milk

Traits
- Weight: Male: 59 kg; Female: 45 kg
- Height: Male: 73 cm; Female: 66 cm
- Wool color: White, occasionally black
- Face color: Black

The Leccese or Moscia Leccese is a breed of domestic sheep indigenous to the Salento peninsula, in Puglia, southern Italy. Its name derives from that of Lecce, the principal city of the peninsula. Like the Pinzirita and the Altamurana, it belongs to the Zackel sheep group. It is a hardy and frugal breed, usually kept in semi-feral herds, capable of surviving year-round on pasture alone. The wool is normally white and the skin flesh-coloured with darker mottlings. In a small proportion of animals the wool is entirely black, and the skin is also black; these black-skinned sheep are resistant to the effects of the poisonous Hypericum crispum, common in the Salento, which in the white-woolled, pale-skinned sheep causes photosensitivity and thus dermatitis.

The Leccese is one of the seventeen autochthonous Italian sheep breeds for which a genealogical herdbook is kept by the Associazione Nazionale della Pastorizia, the Italian national association of sheep-breeders. The herd-book was established in 1972. Total numbers for the breed were estimated at 240,000 in 1983; in 2013 the number recorded in the herd-book was 574.

The milk yield of the Leccese averages 76 ± 21 litres in 180 days for primiparous, and 99 ± 37 L for pluriparous, ewes. The milk has 7% fat and 6.5% protein. Lambs are usually slaughtered at about 90 days, when they weigh approximately 23 kg. Rams yield about 3.2 kg of wool, ewes about 2.1 kg, in two shearings; the wool is of ordinary quality, suitable for mattresses.
