= Pinzirita =

Breed of sheep

- Conservation status: not at risk
- Other names: Pinzunita; Siciliana comune
- Country of origin: Italy
- Distribution: most of Sicily
- Use: Triple-purpose, primarily for milk

Traits
- Weight: Male: 72 kg; Female: 47 kg
- Height: Male: 75 cm; Female: 64 cm
- Wool colour: usually white
- Face colour: white, often with black mottling or patches

The Pinzirita or Pinzunita is a breed of domestic sheep indigenous to the Mediterranean island of Sicily, Italy. Its name derives from pinzuni, the Sicilian language name for the chaffinch, Fringilla coelebs, which it is thought to resemble in colouring. It is also known as the Siciliana comune, or "common Sicilian sheep". It is distributed throughout most of Sicily, except for the southern coast, where the Comisana is preferred, and the hills of the provinces of Agrigento, Caltanissetta and the southern part of the province of Palermo, where the Barbaresca is predominant. Like the Leccese and Altamurana, it belongs to the Zackel sheep group. It is a hardy and frugal breed, well adapted to survival on poor mountain pasture and in the macchia mediterranea biome of inland Sicily.

The Pinzirita is one of the seventeen autochthonous Italian sheep breeds for which a genealogical herdbook is kept by the Associazione Nazionale della Pastorizia, the Italian national association of sheep-breeders. Total numbers for the breed were estimated at 250000 pure-bred animals in 1983; in 2013 the number recorded in the herdbook was 17482.

The milk yield of the Pinzirita averages 80±25 litres in 100 days for primiparous ewes, and about 130±30 litres in 180 days for pluriparous ones. The milk has 6.4% fat and 5.0% protein. Lambs are usually slaughtered unweaned; at 30 days they weigh 7–8 kg. Rams yield about 2.5 kg of wool, ewes about 1.6 kg; the wool is of ordinary quality, suitable for rugs and mattresses.
