= Remo Bertoni (footballer) =

Italian footballer and manager (1929–1993)

Remo Bertoni (24 June 1929 – 30 November 1993) was an Italian footballer and manager. He played as a full-back. He played for Bagnolese in Serie C, before being sold to Brescia in Serie B where a serious injury interrupted his career. He went to play for Napoli trying to recover from the injury but managed to play only one match in Serie A, on 3 June 1953 against Padova. In 1957 he was sold to Padova where he played four matches in Coppa Italia scoring one goal. The subsequent season he went to play for Milan but with the rossoneri he played only in friendlies. After his retirement he had a short and unsuccessful career as a coach in which he managed Potenza and Bolzano, but both teams sacked him before the end of the season. He was born in Brescia. Bertoni died on 30 November 1993, at the age of 64.

== Career a player ==
- 1946-1950 Bagnolese ? (?)
- 1950-1952 Brescia 23 (0)
- 1955-1957 Napoli 1 (0)
- 1957-1958 Padova 0 (0)
- 1959-1961 Milan 0 (0)

== Career as a coach ==
- 1978-1979 Potenza
- 1979-1980 Bolzano
