= Valle del Belice =

Valley of the Belice river, in Sicily, Italy

- Valle del Belìce
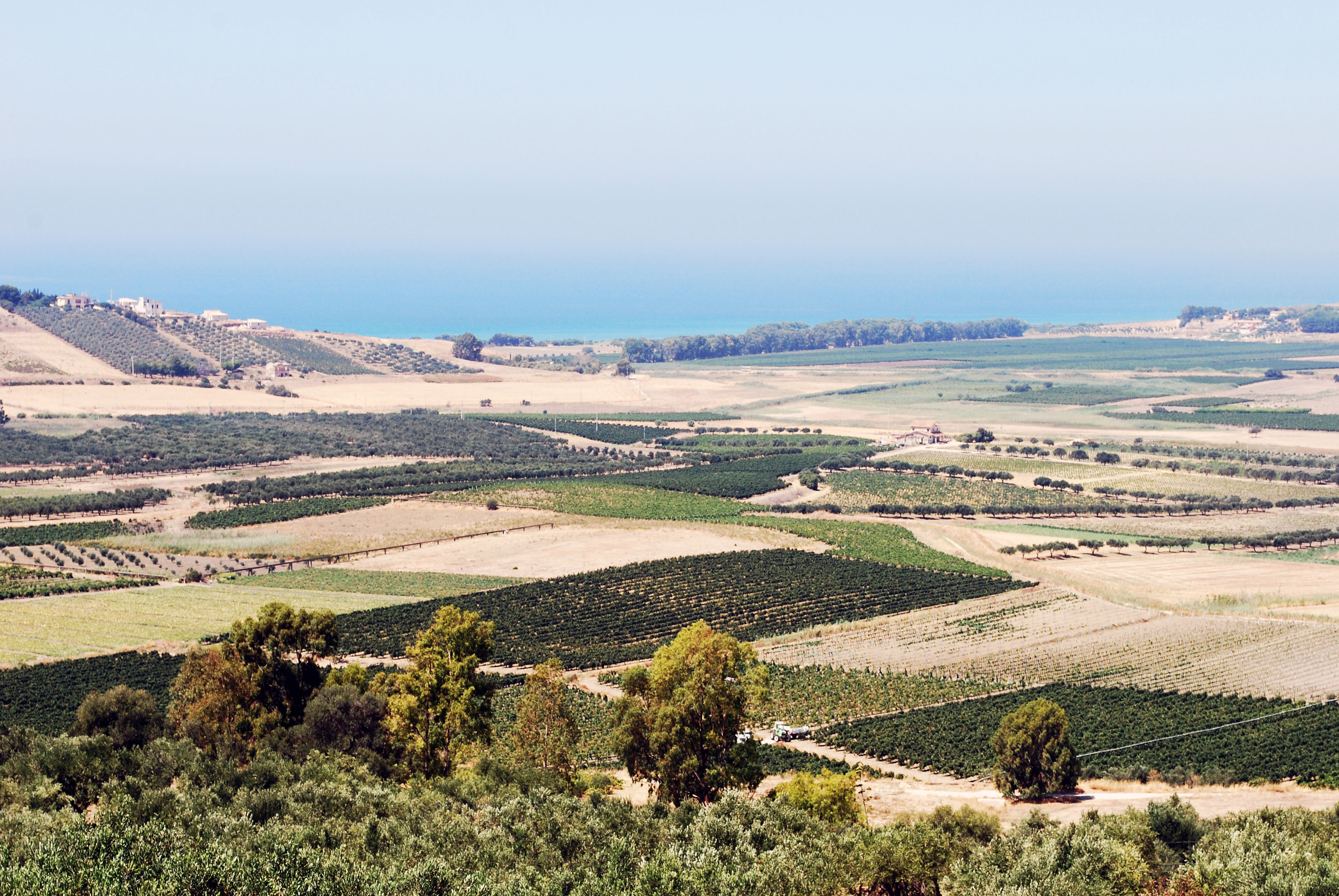
- Length: 77 km (48 mi) NE – SW

Geography
- Location: south-western Sicily
- Coordinates: 37.763°N 13.049°E
- Rivers: Belice; Belice Destro; Belice Sinistro
- Interactive map of Valle del Belice

The Valle del Belice is the valley of the Belice river, in south-western Sicily, Italy. It lies in the provinces of Agrigento, Palermo and Trapani.

== 1968 earthquake ==
The valley was struck by an earthquake in January 1968; in 2012 the damage had still not been fully repaired.

== Agriculture ==
The Valle del Belice breed of domestic sheep originates in the valley. Agricultural products of the area include the D.O.P. Vastedda della valle del Belìce, a pecorino (sheep's milk) cheese, and "Valle del Belìce DOP" extra-virgin olive oil, made from a minimum of 70% Nocellara del Belice olives. Nocellara del Belice table olives also have DOP status.
