= Lamborghini Calà =

Concept car

Lamborghini Calà Concept
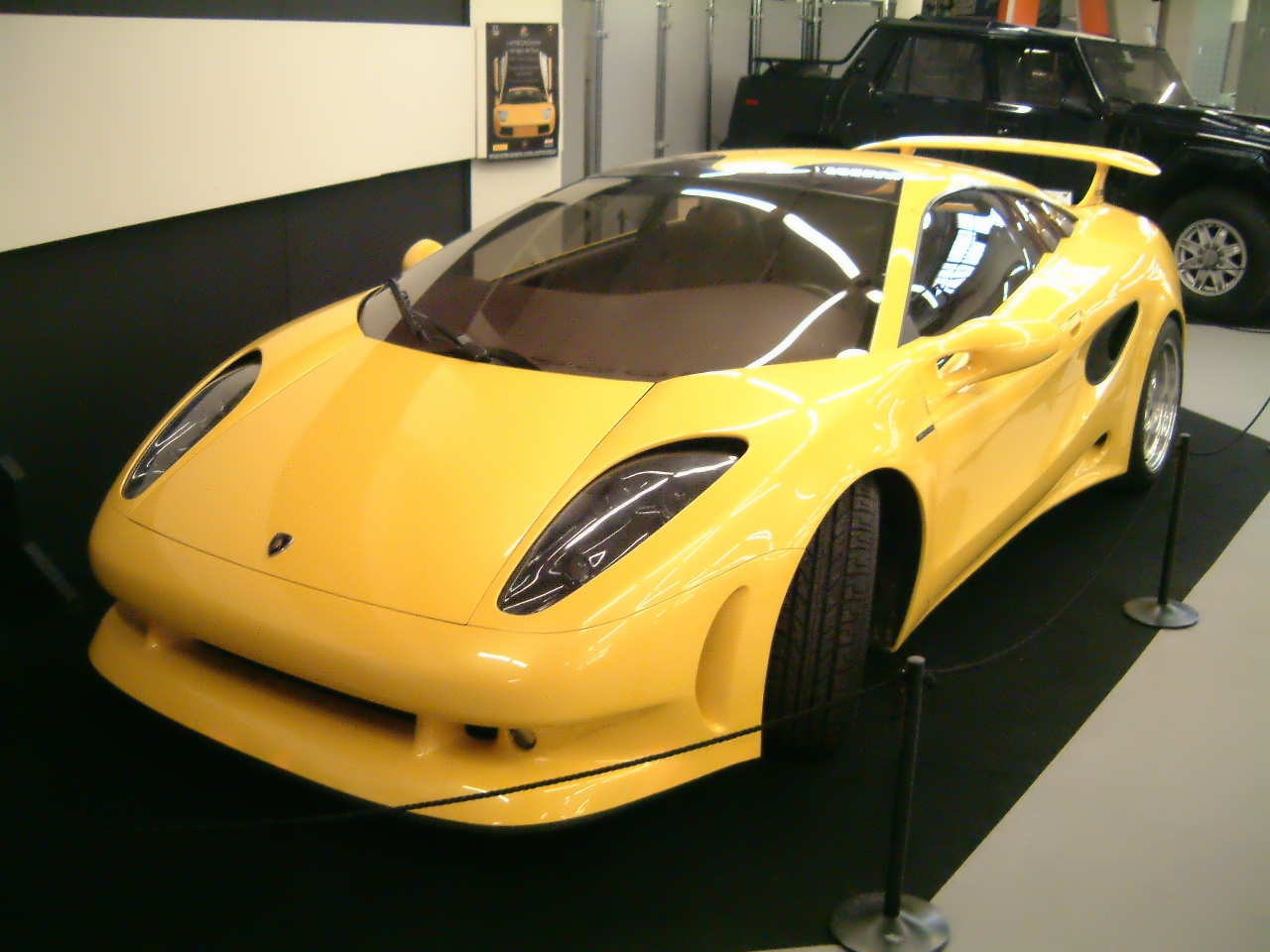

Overview
- Manufacturer: Italdesign Giugiaro for Lamborghini
- Also called: Italdesign Calà
- Production: 1995; 1 prototype
- Assembly: Italy: Sant'Agata Bolognese
- Designer: Giorgetto Giugiaro at Italdesign

Body and chassis
- Class: Concept car
- Body style: 2-door Targa top
- Layout: Rear mid-engine, rear-wheel drive
- Related: Lamborghini P140

Powertrain
- Engine: 4.0 L V10
- Transmission: 6-speed manual

Dimensions
- Wheelbase: 2,522 mm (99.3 in)
- Length: 4,390 mm (172.8 in)
- Width: 1,900 mm (74.8 in)
- Height: 1,222 mm (48.1 in); 1,220 mm (48.0 in) (without roof)
- Kerb weight: 1,290 kg (2,844 lb)

The Lamborghini Calà (also known as the Italdesign Calà) was a concept car designed for Lamborghini by Italdesign Giugiaro. It was first shown at the 1995 Geneva Motor Show. It was a completely functional prototype that never made it into production. Its name was derived from the Piedmontese dialect of Northern Italy and italian word calare, and means “to lower” (not "look, over there").

The Calà was envisioned by Italdesign to fill Lamborghini's need for a replacement for the Jalpa, production of which was discontinued in 1988 at the behest of then owners of the company, Chrysler. When Chrysler sold Lamborghini to Megatech in 1994, the Calà's design took shape, but when Megatech sold Lamborghini to the Volkswagen Group in 1998, the concept was shelved. Fifteen years after the end of its production, the Jalpa would finally be replaced in 2003 by the Gallardo which used the principles of the Calà as an inspiration.

== Design and specifications ==
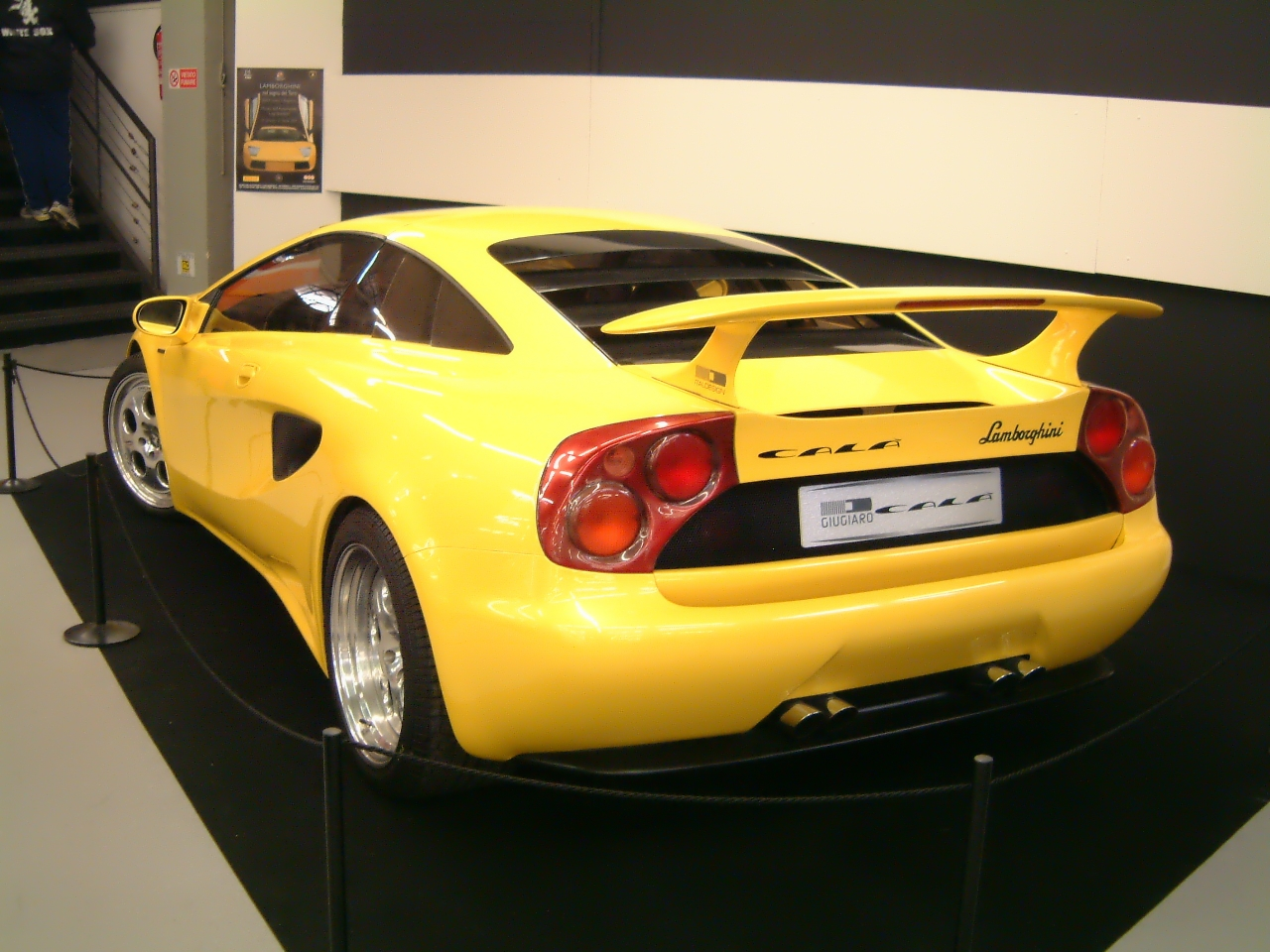
Lamborghini Calà: rear view

The Calà was powered by a mid-mounted V10 engine, which generated a maximum power output of 400 PS (294 kW; 395 hp). It was mated to a 6-speed manual transmission that drove the rear wheels, with an aluminium chassis and a hand-built carbon fibre body. It borrowed elements from some of Lamborghini's iconic production vehicles, such as headlights reminiscent of the Miura and a widescreen similar to that of the Countach. Top speed was estimated at 291 km/h (181 mph), while the 0–97 km/h (0–60 mph) acceleration time was under 5 seconds. The Calà was built on the previous Gandini-styled P140 prototype.

== Other media ==
The car is featured on the cover and in the 1997 video game Need for Speed II.
