= Barbaresca =

Breed of sheep

- Conservation status: FAO (2007): not at risk; rapidly decreasing
- Other names: Barbaresca Siciliana
- Country of origin: Italy
- Distribution: Sicily; Abruzzo
- Standard: MIPAAF
- Type: fat-tailed
- Use: triple-purpose: meat/milk/wool

Traits
- Weight: Male: 110 kg; Female: 65 kg
- Height: Male: 85 cm; Female: 80 cm
- Skin color: pinkish, tending to pale brown
- Wool color: white
- Face color: white, often mottled with black

The Barbaresca or Barbaresca Siciliana is a breed of large fat-tailed sheep from the Mediterranean island of Sicily, in southern Italy. It derives from the cross-breeding between indigenous Sicilian Pinzirita sheep with fat-tailed Barbary (or Barbarin) sheep of Maghrebi origin. These were probably brought to the island after the Muslim conquest of Sicily in the 9th century; Arabic texts preserved at Agrigento document the movement of large numbers of sheep to the Sicilian interior.

The Barbaresca is raised throughout most of Sicily and in Abruzzo. It is a triple-purpose breed, yielding meat, milk, and wool. The wool is not now in demand and the Barbaresca is kept principally for meat and milk production. It yields approximately 140–160 litres of milk per lactation, with 6–9% fat.

The Barbaresca is one of the seventeen autochthonous Italian sheep breeds for which a genealogical herdbook is kept by the Associazione Nazionale della Pastorizia, the Italian national association of sheep-breeders. In 1983 the breed population was estimated at 75,000 head, of which 5500 were registered. In 2013 the number registered for the breed was 1260.
