= Andrea Bertoni (banker) =

Italian banker

- Bertoni in 2026
- Education: University of Parma
- Occupations: Economist and business executive
- Known for: CEO of Davis & Morgan

Andrea Bertoni is an Italian business executive who is the Managing Director of Davis & Morgan S.p.A., a Milan-based merchant bank with a focus on non-performing loan management.

== Education and early career ==
Bertoni graduated from the University of Parma. He joined the George S. May International SpA, becoming an executive in two years.

== Career ==
In 2003, he founded Bertoni Costruzioni Srl, a company specializing in the Ligurian construction sector.

Bertoni founded Davis & Morgan on March 17, 2008, as a banking house. This came following the 2008 financial crisis and the collapse of Lehman Brothers.

In 2017, the Oetker family, owners of the multinational jam company Hero, acquired a 25% stake in Davis & Morgan. In 2018, the company began focusing on small-denomination mortgage loans in Milan, becoming its main business.

His company launched an application in 2023.

In 2024, Bertoni was included on Forbes' list of top 100 money managers.
