= Comisana =

Italian breed of sheep

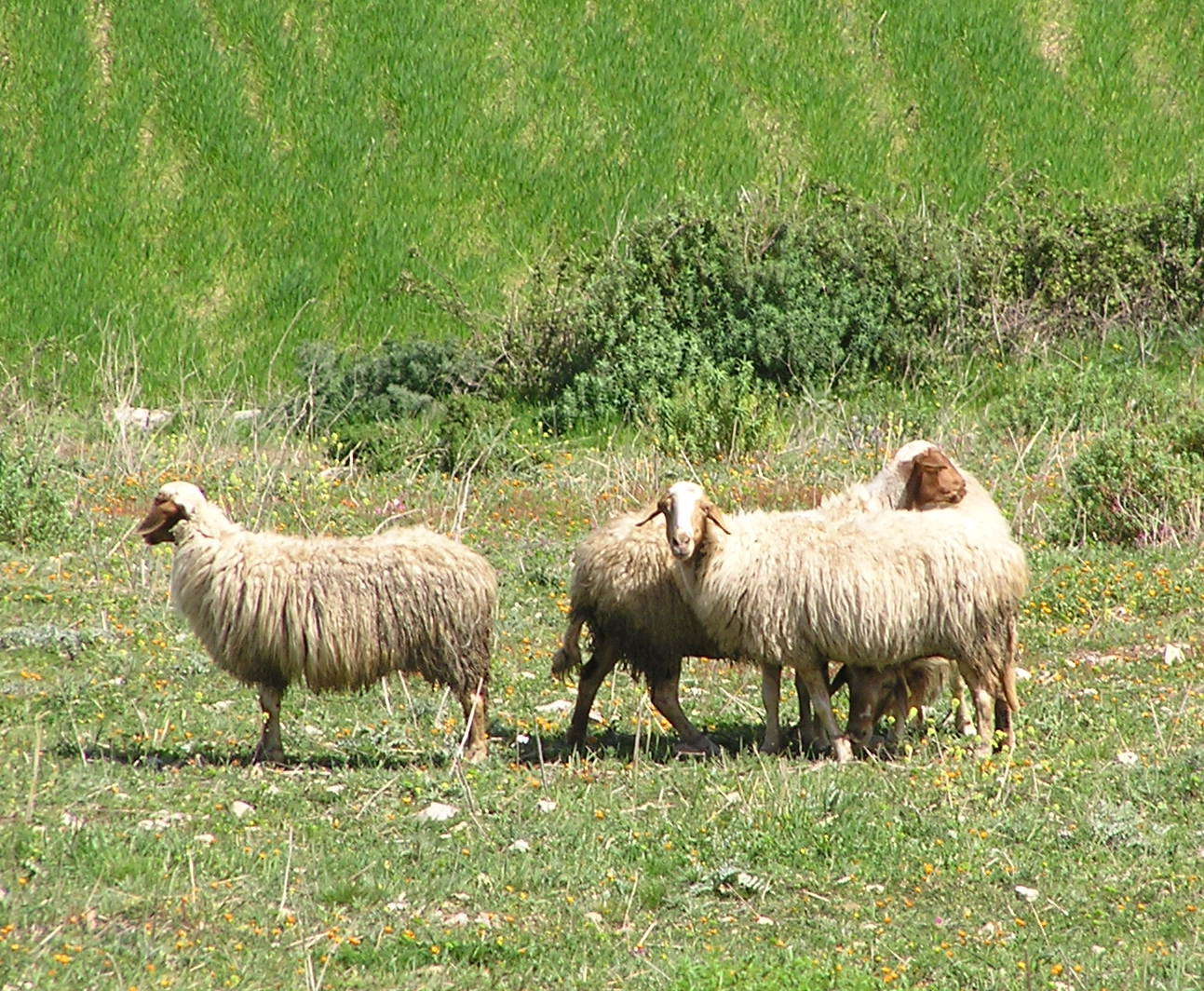

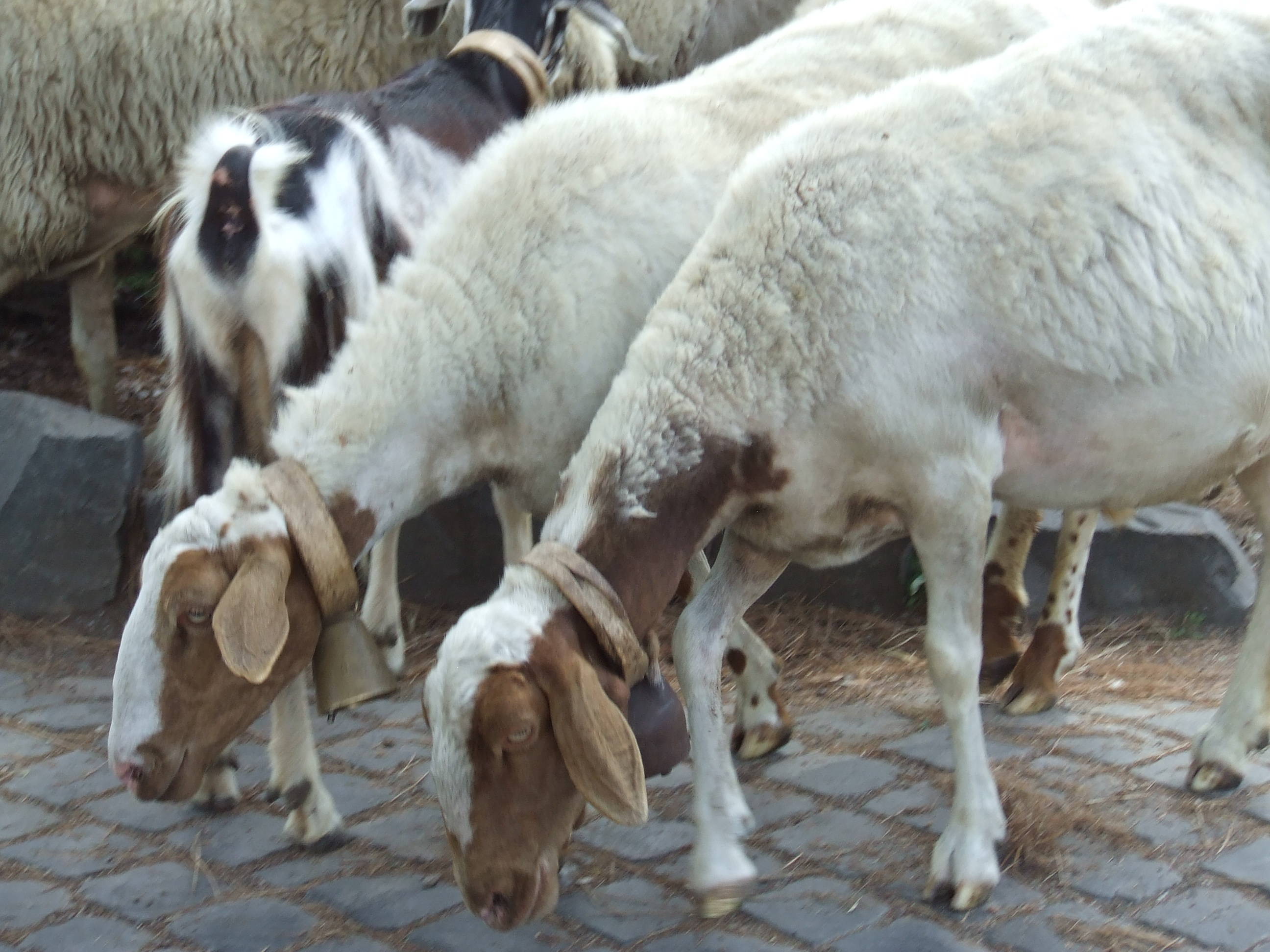
- Conservation status: FAO (2007): not at risk
- Other names: Faccia Rossa; Lentinese
- Country of origin: Italy
- Distribution: north and central Sicily
- Standard: MIPAAF
- Use: triple-purpose, primarily for milk

Traits
- Weight: Male: 80 kg; Female: 50 kg
- Height: Male: 80 cm; Female: 70 cm
- Wool colour: white
- Face colour: brick-red with white frontal stripe
- Horn status: hornless in both sexes

The Comisana, also known as the Faccia Rossa or Lentinese, is an Italian breed of domestic sheep indigenous to central and northern areas of the Mediterranean island of Sicily. Its name derives from that of the comune of Comiso, in the province of Ragusa. It is raised principally in the provinces of Caltanissetta, Enna and Palermo, but is found in many other Italian provinces and has also been exported to other Mediterranean countries.

== History ==
The origins of the Comisana are obscure; it is a southern Mediterranean breed. It appears to derive from cross-breeding of the Sicilian Pinzirita with Maltese stock imported to Sicily towards the end of the nineteenth century.

It is one of the seventeen autochthonous Italian sheep breeds for which a genealogical herd-book is kept by the Associazione Nazionale della Pastorizia, the Italian national association of sheep-breeders; the herdbook was established in 1976. Total numbers for the breed were estimated at 350000 in 1983, of which 64500 were registered in the herdbook. In 2013 the number recorded in the herdbook was 28428; in 2023 it was 3968. In 2025 the conservation status of the breed was listed in DAD-IS as "at risk/vulnerable".

== Use ==
The milk yield of the Comisana averages 104±30 kg per lactation for primiparous ewes, and 189±51 kg for pluriparous ones. It may exceed 500 kg. The milk has 6.5% fat and 5.2% protein. Lambs are usually slaughtered at the age of about one month, at a weight of 9–10 kg. Rams yield about 2.5 kg of wool, ewes about 1.3 kg; the wool is of coarse quality, suitable for mattresses.
