= Altamurana =

Italian breed of sheep

- Conservation status: FAO (2007): critical-maintained; at risk of extinction
- Country of origin: Italy
- Distribution: Puglia; Basilicata
- Standard: MIPAAF
- Use: formerly triple-purpose, meat/milk/wool; now principally for milk

Traits
- Weight: Male: 53 kg; Female: 39 kg
- Height: Male: 72 cm; Female: 65 cm
- Skin colour: pinkish white, black speckles or spots
- Wool colour: white
- Face colour: white

The Altamurana is an Italian breed of sheep from the province of Bari, in Puglia in southern Italy. It is of Asiatic, possibly Syrian, origin. It is raised mainly in the provinces of Bari and Foggia, and takes its name from the town of Altamura, in the Murge. It was formerly considered a triple-purpose breed, yielding meat, milk, and wool; it is now kept principally for milk production. It yields approximately 65 kg of milk per lactation, with an average of 7.5% fat and 6.5% protein.

The Altamurana is one of the seventeen autochthonous Italian sheep breeds for which a genealogical herdbook is kept by the Associazione Nazionale della Pastorizia, the Italian national association of sheep-breeders. In 1984, the breed population was estimated at 190000 head. In 2012, the total number recorded for the breed was 230; it is considered to be at risk of extinction.
