= Bertone (surname) =

Bertone is an Italian surname meaning "descendant of Roberto". Notable people with the surname include:

- Alicia Bertone, American academic, researcher, and veterinary surgeon
- Catherine Bertone (born 1972), Turkish-born female Italian marathon runner
- Emanuele Balbo Bertone (1886–1945), Italian general during World War II
- Giovanni Bertone (1884–1972), Italian automobile designer, known for establishing the Carrozzeria Bertone business
- Leonardo Bertone (born 1994), Swiss footballer
- Maurizio Bertone, C.R.S. (1639–1701), Roman Catholic prelate who served as Bishop of Fossano
- Giuseppe Bertone (called "Nuccio", 1914–1997), Italian automobile designer and constructor
- Oscar Bertone (born 1967), Italian former diver
- Oriane Bertone (born 2005), French rock climber
- Rosana Bertone (born 1972), Argentine politician
- Tarcisio Bertone (born 1934), Italian Cardinal of the Roman Catholic Church

== Companies ==
- Gruppo Bertone, an Italian automobile company which specializes in car styling

== See also ==
- Bertoni
