= List of Swiss sheep breeds =

This is a list of the Swiss breeds of sheep, with various names used for them in that country:

English name (if used)	German	French	Italian	Image
	Braunköpfiges Fleischschaf			
	Bündner Oberländerschaf; Bündner Oberländer Schaf			
		Charollais Suisse		
Red Engadine	Engadiner Schaf; Engadinerschaf; Paterschaf; Fuchsfarbenes Engadinerschaf; Engadiner Fuchsschaf; Engadiner Landschaf	Mouton d'Engadine; Roux d'Engadine		
	Saaser Mutte			
	Schwarzbraunes Bergschaf			
	Spiegelschaf			
	Walliser Landschaf	Roux du Valais		
Valais Blacknose	Walliser Schwarznasenschaf			
	Weisses Alpenschaf; Weißes Alpenschaf			

== Extinct breeds ==
Many Swiss sheep breeds are considered to be extinct. These include:

- Bündner Bergschaf or Oberhalbsteinerschaf
- Flehm Schaf or Grosses Freiburger Schaf
- Frutiger Schaf
- Genferschaf or Race de mouton dite muscs
- Glarner Schaf
- Grabser Schaf
- Hilträter Schaf
- Isone Schaf or Tessiner Schaf
- Kleines Freiburger Schaf or Brachputzen
- Lötschen Schaf
- Luzeiner Schaf
- Nalpser Schaf
- Oberhasler Schaf
- Ormonter Schaf
- Prättigauer Schaf
- Roux de Bagnes
- Saaner Landschaf
- Schwarzenburg-Guggisberg Schaf
- Schweizerisches Landschaf or Luzernerschaf or Emmentaler Schaf
- Schwyzer Schaf or Urner Landschaf
- Simmentaler Schaf
- Soglio Schaf or Bergeller Schaf
- St. Galler Oberländer Schaf or Sarganser Schaf
- Steinschaf or Urnerschaf or Unterwaldner Schaf
- Tavetscher Schaf
- Toggenburger Schaf or Wildhauser Schaf
- Unterwaldner Landschaf
- Valser Schaf or Safierschaf
- Visper Schaf
- Vriner Schaf
- Waadtländer Schaf or Brebis du Pays Vaud
