= Braunköpfiges Fleischschaf =

Swiss breed of sheep

- Conservation status: FAO (2007): not listed; DAD-IS (2026): at risk/vulnerable
- Other names: Mouton à viande à tête brune
- Country of origin: Switzerland
- Standard: Schweizerischer Schafzuchtverband
- Use: meat; vegetation management

Traits
- Weight: Male: 110 kg; Female: 80 kg
- Height: Male: 81 cm; Female: 74 cm
- Wool colour: white
- Face colour: brown or black
- Horn status: polled

The Braunköpfiges Fleischschaf is a Swiss breed of domestic sheep. It derives from cross-breeding of the Grabs of the Canton of St. Gallen with Oxford Down stock imported from the United Kingdom. It is one of the nine principal surviving Swiss sheep breeds; others are the Bündner Oberländerschaf, the Red Engadine, the Saaser Mutte, the Schwarzbraunes Bergschaf, the Spiegelschaf, the Valais Blacknose, the Walliser Landschaf or Roux du Valais and the Weisses Alpenschaf.

== History ==
The Braunköpfiges Fleischschaf derives from cross-breeding of the Grabser Schaf of the Canton of St. Gallen with Oxford Down stock imported from the United Kingdom, as a result of which the Grabser ceased to exist as a separate breed and is listed as extinct. A herd-book was established in 1919.

The total population reported in Switzerland for 2025 was between 5045 and 16161, with a breeding stock of 4672 ewes and 373 rams; the conservation status of the breed is listed as 'at risk/vulnerable'.

== Characteristics ==
It is a medium- to large-sized sheep: average weights are about 80 kg for ewes and 100 kg for rams, with heights at the withers of approximately 74 cm and 81 cm respectively. It is a short-wool breed, with a thick white fleece extending over the upper face and down the legs; the face is brown or black.

== Use ==
The Braunköpfiges Fleischschaf is reared principally for meat. Fleeces commonly weigh from 4.5 to 5.5 kg, with an average staple length of approximately 40 mm.
