= Vernagt =

Hamlet in South Tyrol, Italy

Vernagt Vernago
- Hamlet
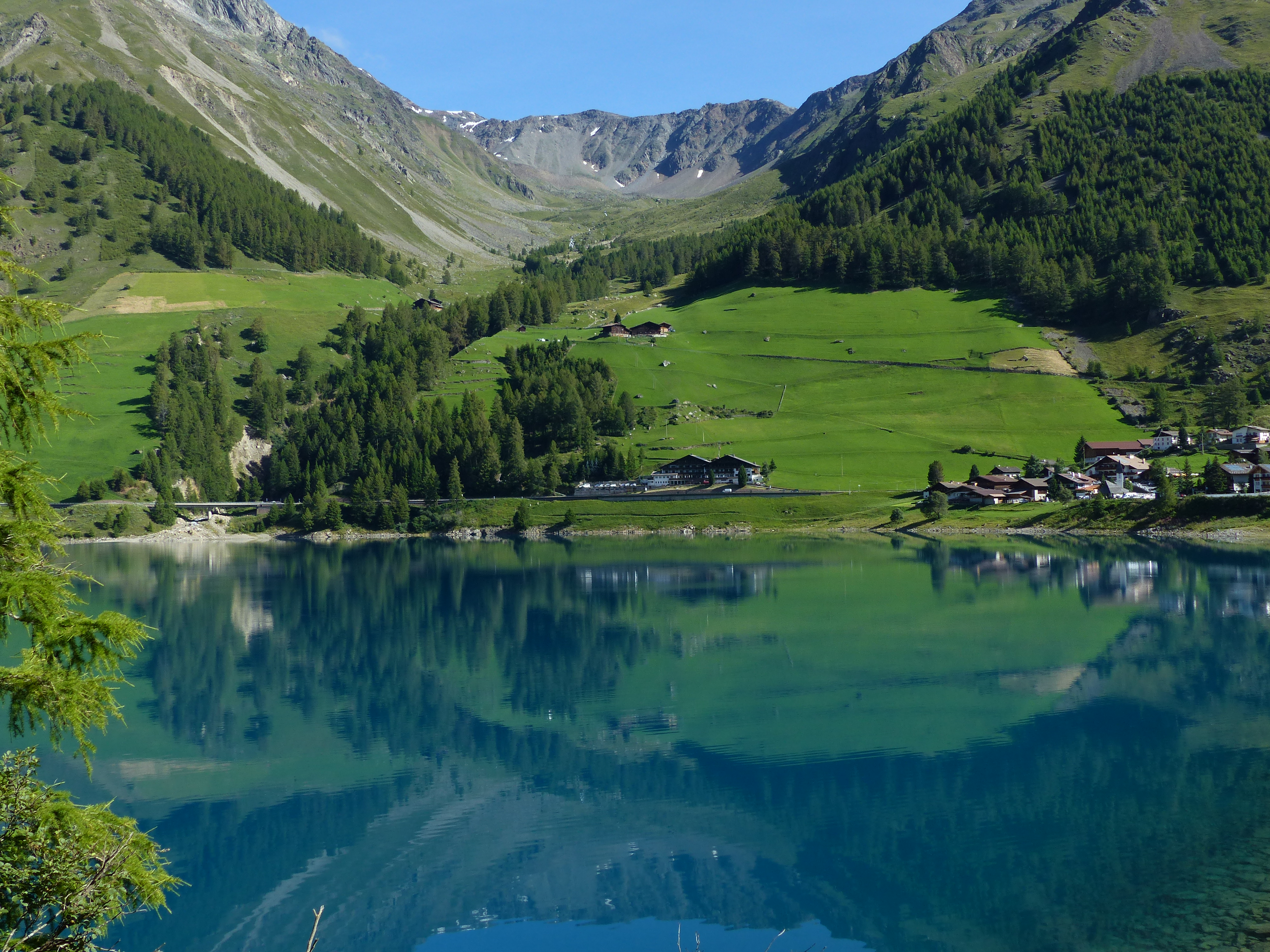
- Interactive map of Vernagt
- Coordinates: 46°44′13″N 10°50′57″E
- Country: Italy
- Province: South Tyrol
- Commune: Schnals
- Established: Rebuilt in the 1950s
- Elevation: 1,700 m (5,600 ft)

Population (2012)
  - Total: 53
- Time zone: UTC+1
  - Summer (DST): +2 (CEST)
- Postal code: 39020
- post code: 0473

Vernagt am See (Italy Vernago) is a small hamlet in Schnalstal, South Tyrol, Italy, with a population of 53 (2011). It belongs to the Schnals municipality and the frazione Unser Frau, within the Ötztal Alps. The hamlet is situated directly on the banks of Vernagt-Stausee lake.
