= Schnals =

- Comune
- Gemeinde Schnals; Comune di Senales
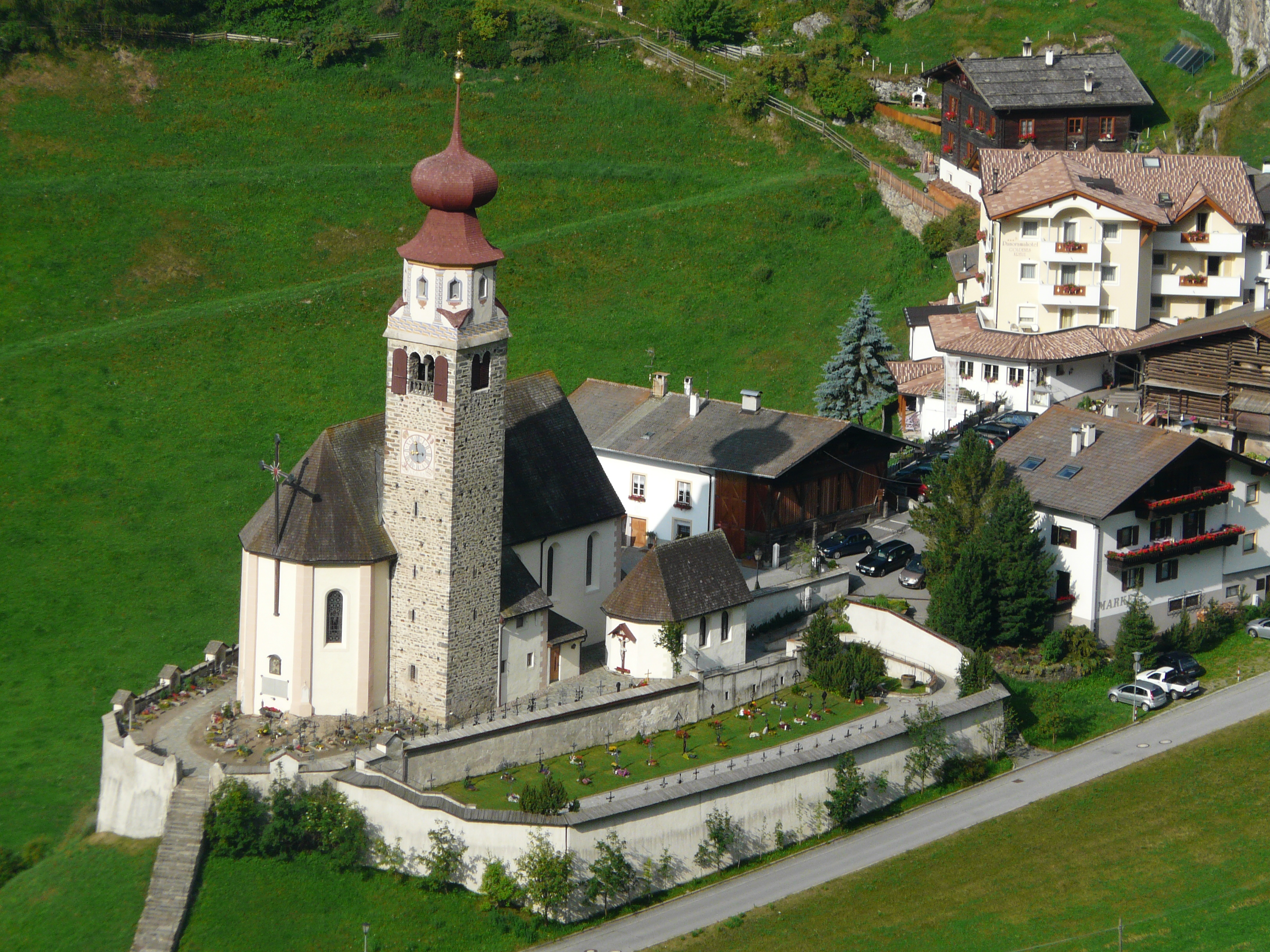
- Church of the Assumption of Virgin Mary

- Location within Italy Location within Trentino-Alto Adige/Südtirol
- Coordinates: 46°43′30″N 10°51′45″E
- Country: Italy
- Region: Trentino-Alto Adige/Südtirol
- Province: South Tyrol (BZ)
- Frazioni: Karthaus (Certosa), Katharinaberg (Monte Santa Caterina), Unser Frau (Madonna)

Government
  - Mayor: Peter Grüner (SVP)

Area
  - Total: 211.2 km^{2} (81.5 sq mi)

Population (Nov. 2010)
  - Total: 1,345
  - Density: 6.368/km^{2} (16.49/sq mi)
- Demonym(s): German: Schnalser; Italian: senalesini
- Time zone: UTC+1 (CET)
  - Summer (DST): UTC+2 (CEST)
- Postal code: 39020
- Dialing code: 0473
- Website: Official website

Schnals (German pronunciation: [ʃnals]; Italian: Senales [seˈnaːles]) is a comune (municipality) in the autonomous province of South Tyrol in northern Italy, located about 40 kilometres (25 mi) northwest of the city of Bolzano, on the border with Austria. The municipality includes large parts of the Schnalstal.

== Geography ==
As of 30 November 2010, it had a population of 1,345 and an area of 211.2 square kilometres (81.5 mi^{2}).

Schnals borders the following municipalities: Kastelbell-Tschars, Latsch, Mals, Moos in Passeier, Naturns, Partschins, Schlanders, and Sölden (Austria).

=== Frazioni ===
The municipality of Schnals contains the frazioni (subdivisions, mainly villages and hamlets) Karthaus (Certosa), and Katharinaberg (Monte Santa Caterina), Unser Frau (Madonna). It also contains Vernagt, a hamlet bordering the Vernagt-Stausee lake.

== History ==
=== Coat-of-arms ===
The shield is azure and argent party per pale. The first part represents Gabriel of or with a sword in his right hand over the head, and a scales in the left, standing on a sable dragon with a gules tongue. Three azure gyrons, with the point on the division, are in the second part. The shield represents the patron saint of the Carthusian Abbey of Allerengelberg and the arms of the Lords of Schandersberg. The emblem was adopted in 1967.

== Society ==
=== Linguistic distribution ===
According to the 2024 census, 97.89% of the population speak German and 2.11% Italian as first language.

== Demographic evolution ==
Historical population

Year	Pop.	±%
1860	?	—
1870	?	—
1880	1,133	—
1900	?	—
1910	1,110	—

Year	Pop.	±%
1921	1,086	−2.2%
1931	1,101	+1.4%
1936	1,158	+5.2%
1951	1,283	+10.8%
1961	1,346	+4.9%

Year	Pop.	±%
1971	1,267	−5.9%
1981	1,327	+4.7%
1991	1,379	+3.9%
2001	1,394	+1.1%

Source: Data from ISTAT

== Images ==
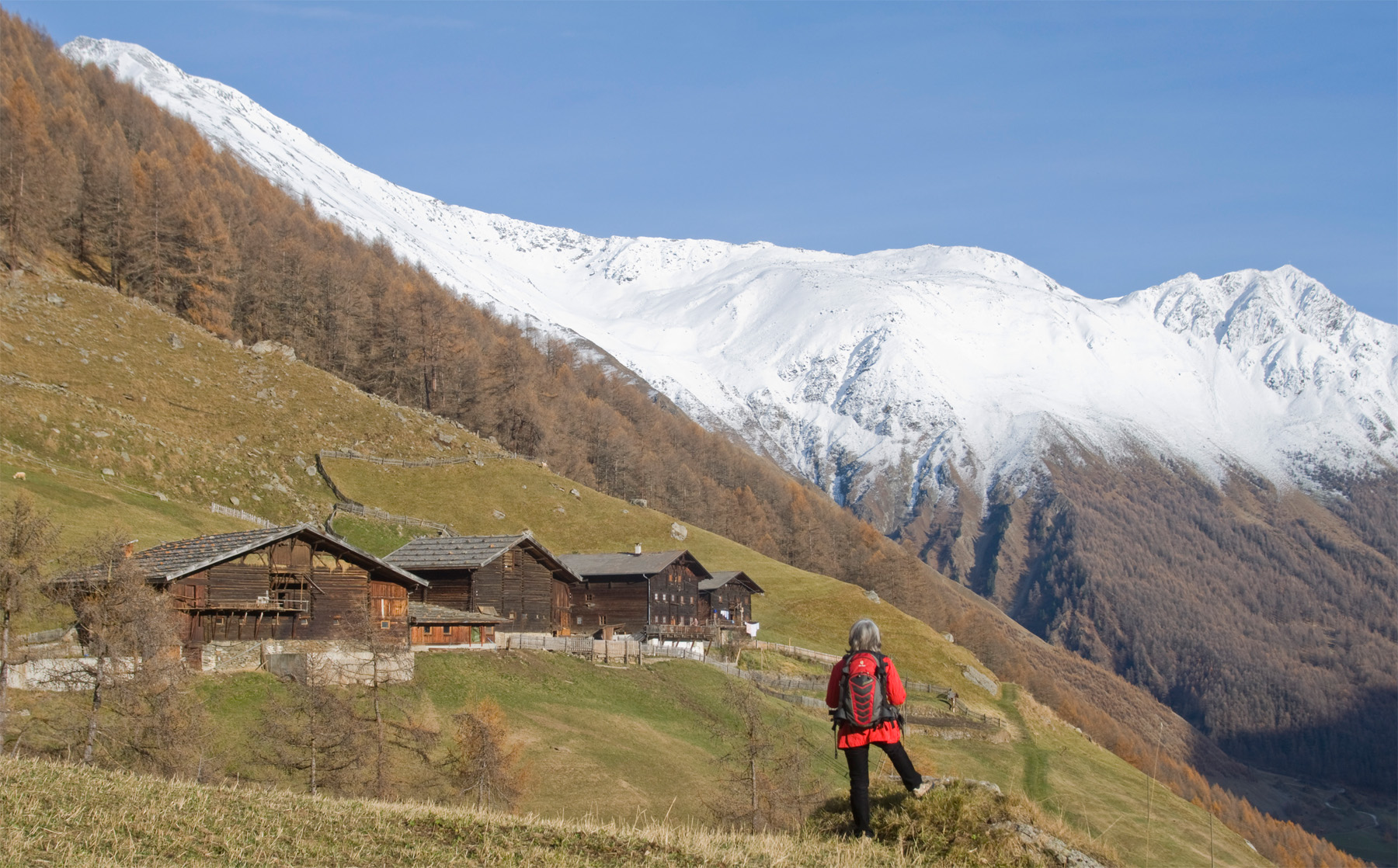
The Finailhöfe - leftmost snow-capped mountain is the Similaun. Out of sight to the left is the Fineilspitze, on which ridge Ötzi the Iceman was found.

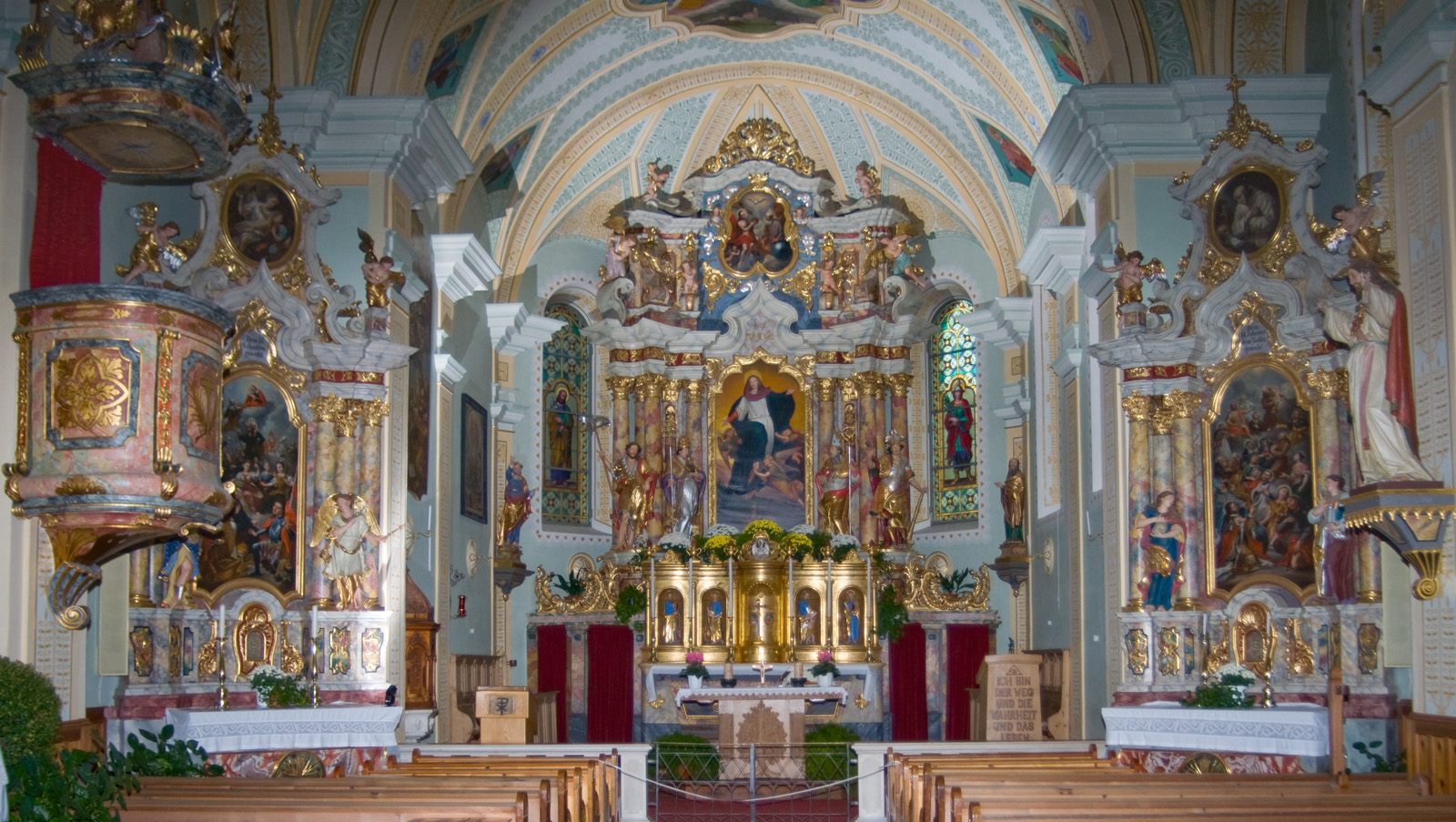
Village Church Unser Frau
