= Braunes Bergschaf =

Breed of sheep

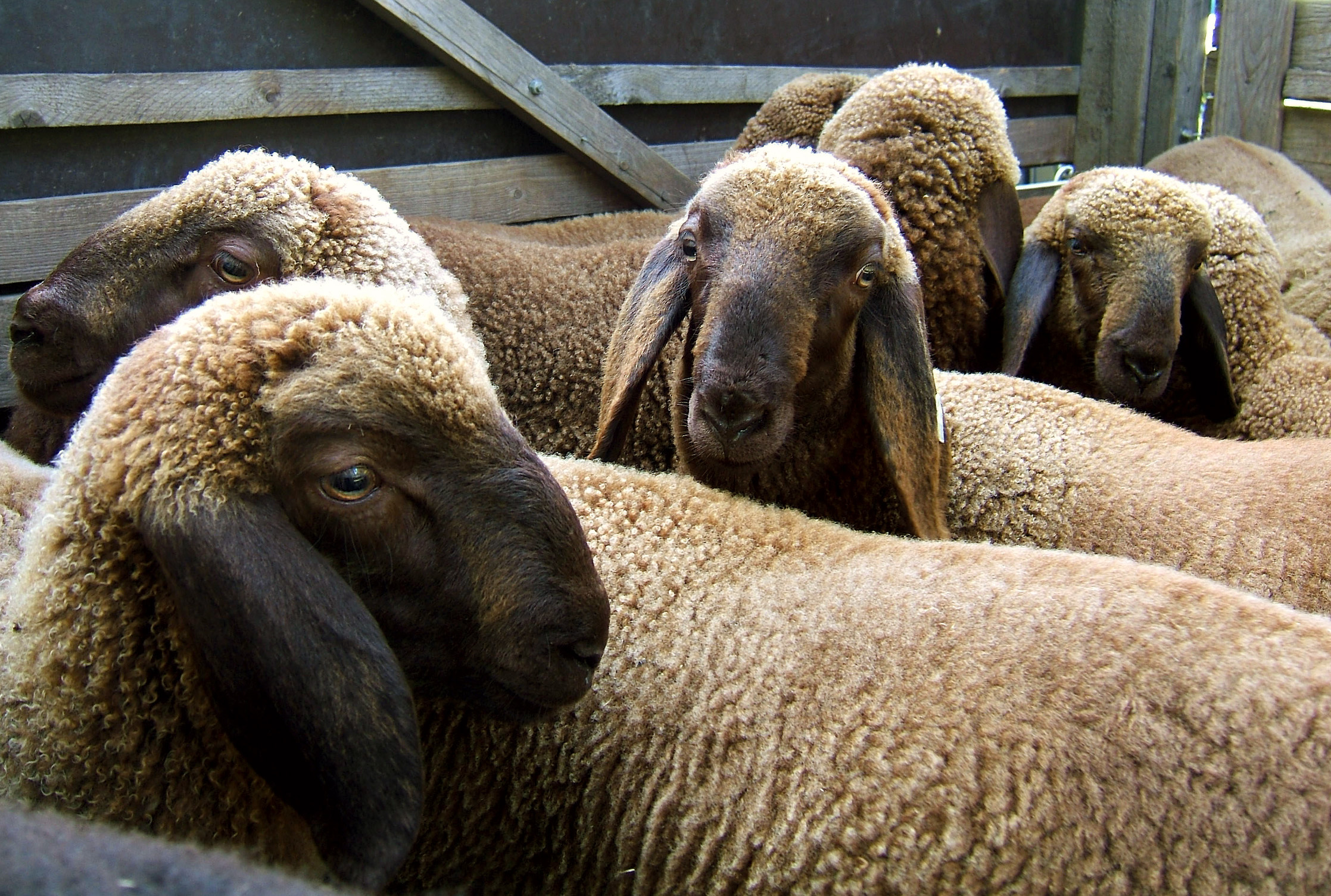
- Other names: Schwarzbraunes Bergschaf (Italy); Pecora nera-bruna
- Country of origin: Austria; Italy
- Distribution: Austria; Germany; Italy; Switzerland
- Use: dual-purpose, meat and wool

Traits
- Weight: Male: 80–100 kg; Female: 60–70 kg
- Wool colour: black or brown
- Face colour: black or brown

The Braunes Bergschaf is a breed of domestic sheep from the Tyrol area of Austria and Italy. It derives from cross-breeding of the Tiroler Steinschaf of the Tyrol with the Italian Bergamasca and Padovana breeds. It is raised in the Austrian states of Lower Austria, Salzburg, Styria and Tyrol; in the Vinschgau, Ultental, Passeiertal and Schnalstal in the autonomous province of Bolzano in Italy; in the Swiss Engadine; and in Baden-Württemberg, Bavaria, Lower Saxony and Mecklenburg-Vorpommern in Germany.

In Italy the Braunes Bergschaf is known as the "Schwarzbraunes Bergschaf", while the Swiss Schwarzbraunes Bergschaf is in Italy called 'Juraschaf'. It is one of the forty-two autochthonous local sheep breeds of limited distribution for which a herdbook is kept by the Associazione Nazionale della Pastorizia, the Italian national association of sheep-breeders.

Numbers were reported to be 3698 to 5000 in Austria in 2012, 1564 in Germany in 2011 and 2850 in Italy in 2008.

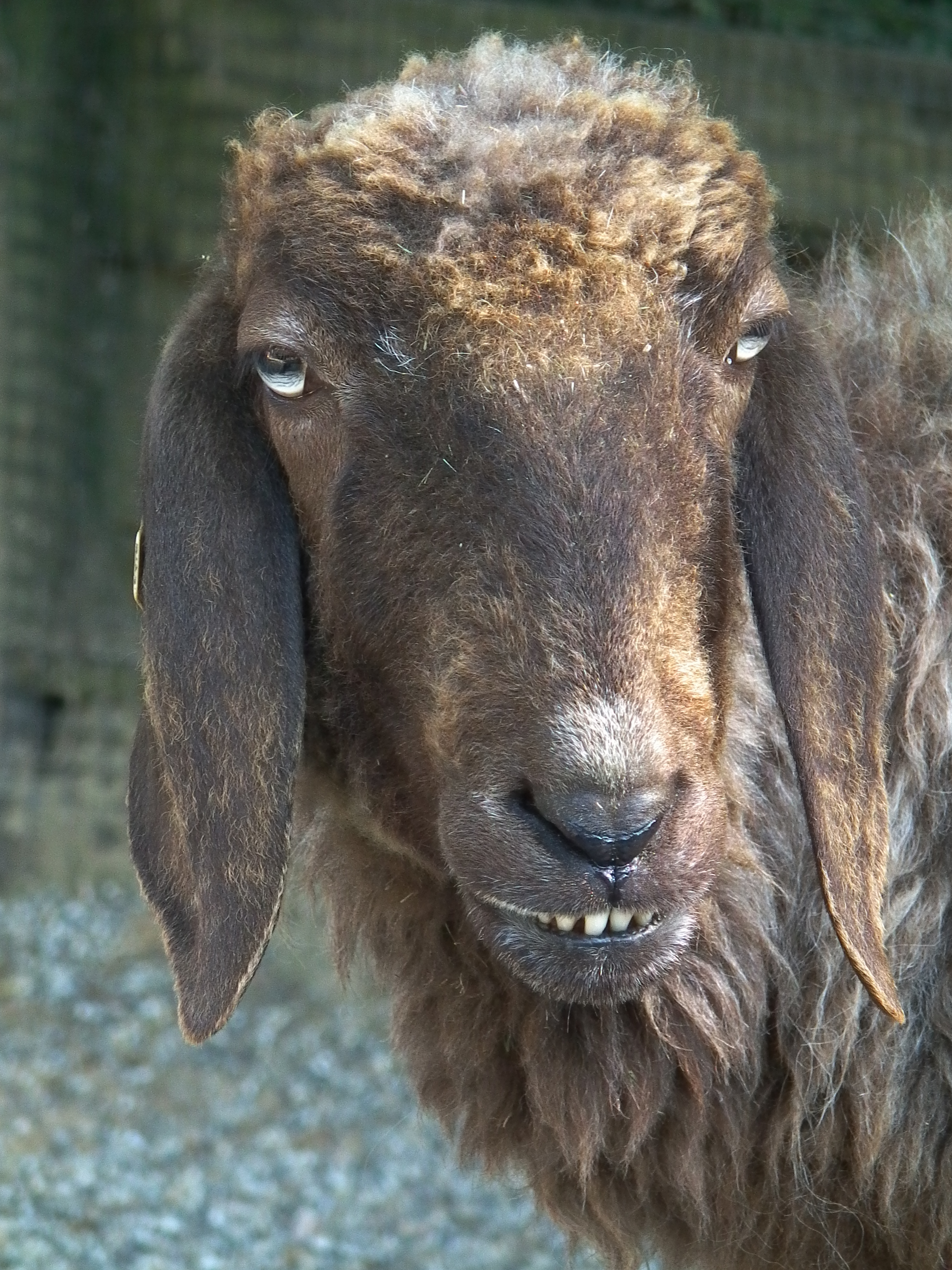

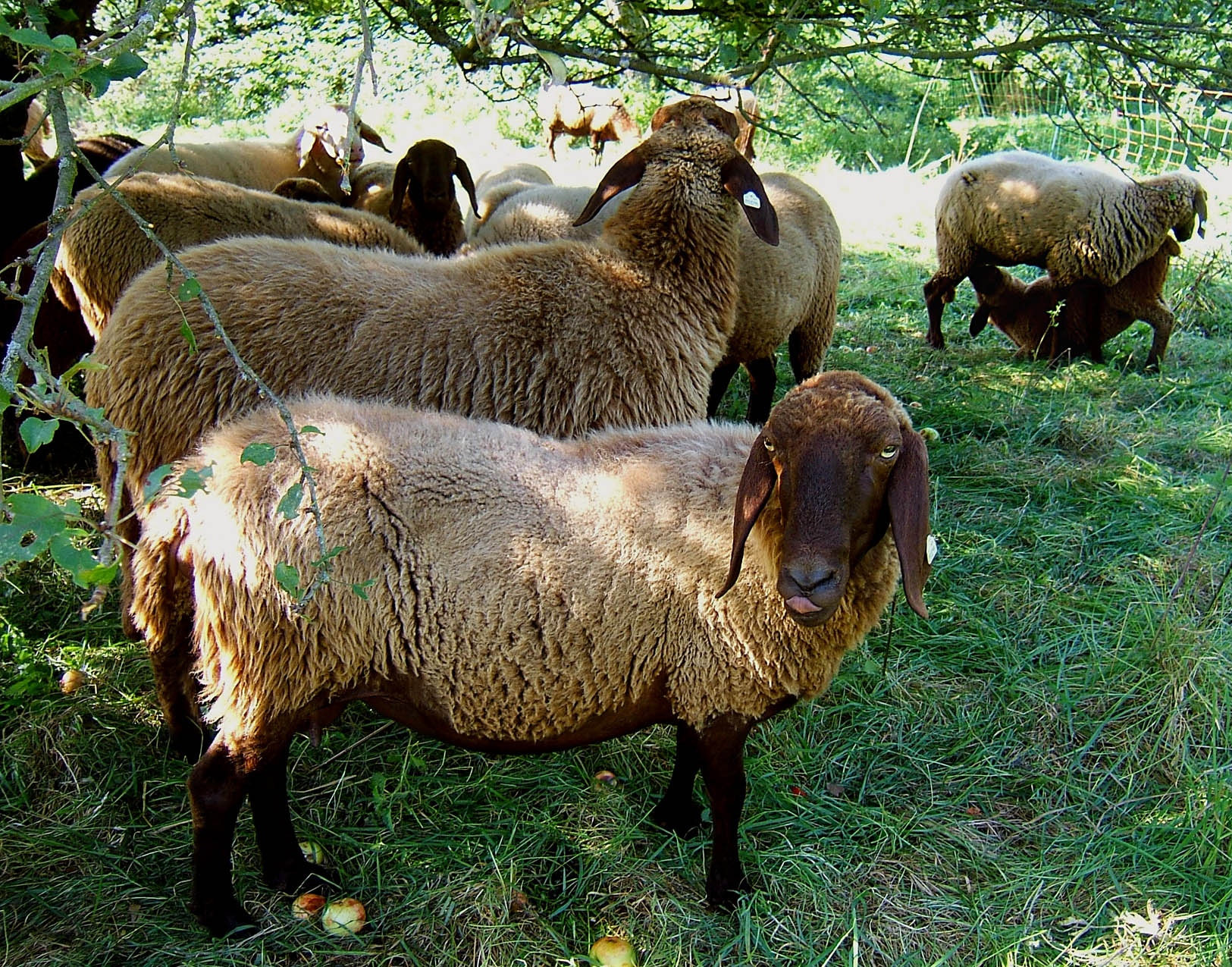

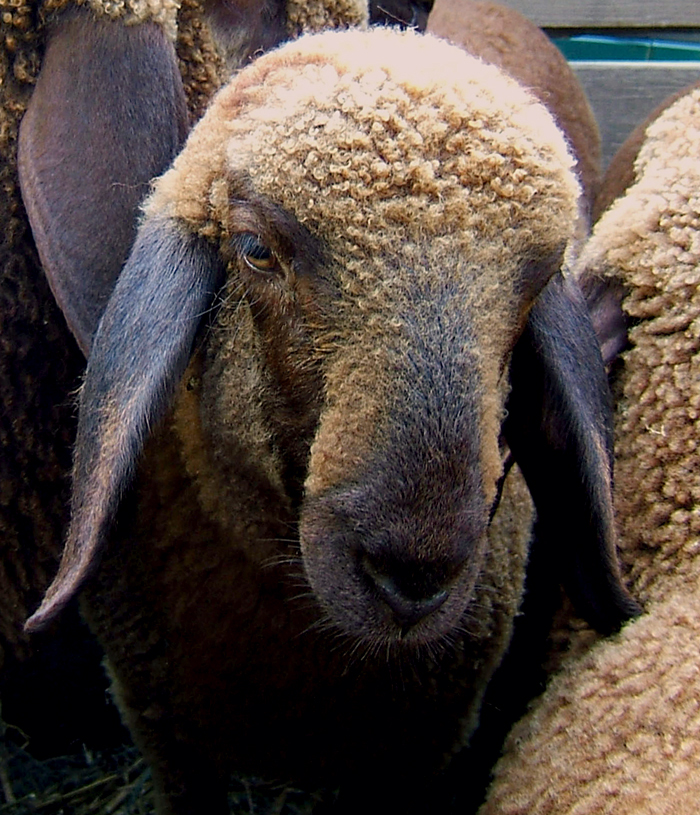

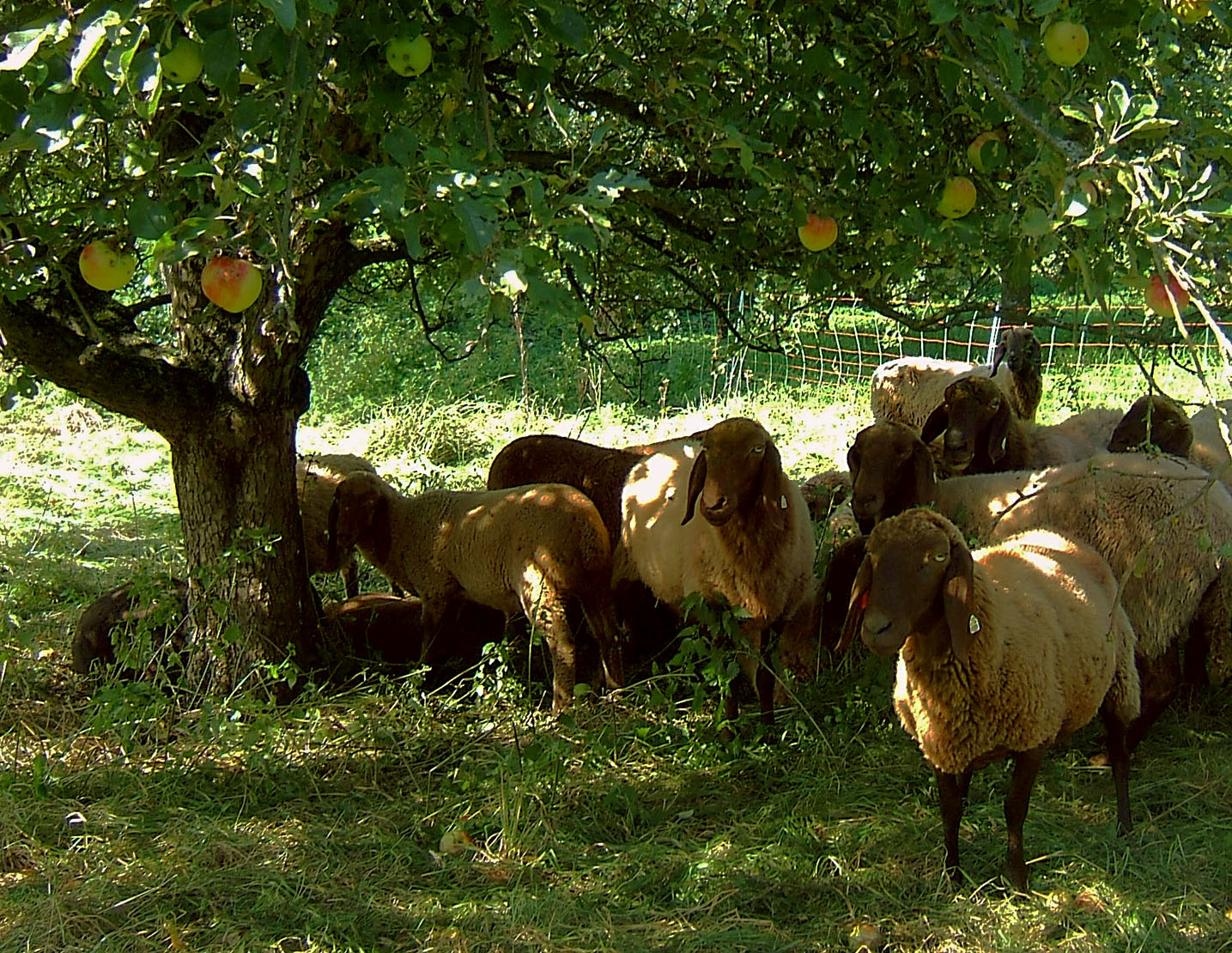
