= Outer Schwyz =

Canton of Schwyz Outer Territory Kanton Schwyz Äusseres Land (German) Canton de Schwytz-Extérieur (French) Svitto Esterno (Italian)
- 1831–1833
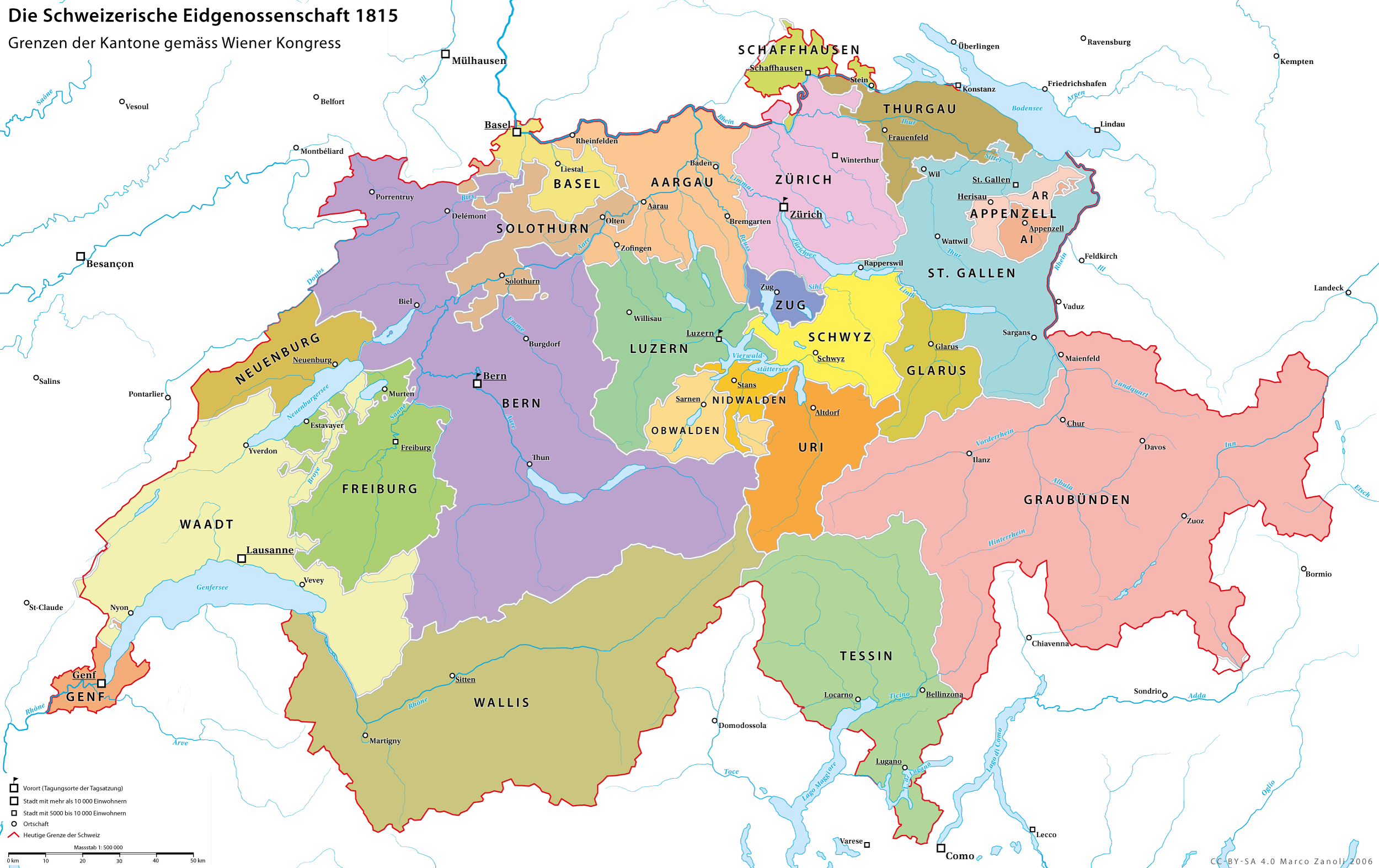
- Switzerland following the Congress of Vienna, with the borders of Outer Schwyz and Inner Schwyz
- Status: Half-canton
- Capital: Einsiedeln 47°7′N 8°44′E; Lachen 47°11′N 8°51′E
- Government: Republic
- Historical era: Restoration and Regeneration
  - Seceded from Schwyz: 1831
  - Forcibly reunited with [Inner] Schwyz: 1833
Preceded by	Succeeded by
Canton of Schwyz	Canton of Schwyz

Outer Schwyz (German: Ausserschwyz [ˈaʊsərˌʃviːts], formally Kanton Schwyz äusseres Land, Canton of Schwyz Outer Territory) was a half-canton of Switzerland from 1831 to 1833.

In 1831 the three outer districts of Schwyz, centered on Pfäffikon, March and Einsiedeln, and the district of Küssnacht, wished to secede from Schwyz within the scope of the regeneration movement. They were mainly concerned by their political disadvantage in comparison to the more ancient part of the canton and the unwillingness of conservative elements to reform the canton's constitution.

The remaining half-canton was called Inner Schwyz; it comprised the older part of the canton as well as the community of Wollerau.

In January 1831 a provisional government of the half-canton was instituted at a people's assembly at Lachen. After further negotiations, the constitution was then agreed in April 1832. The half-canton was provisionally recognised by the Confederal government in April 1833, and Joachim Schmid was recognised as the official delegate to the federal parliament.

In July 1833, [Inner] Schwyz invaded and occupied the district of Küssnacht under Colonel Theodor Ab-Yberg. The Confederal government then intervened militarily and forced the parties to unite. In October 1833, following negotiations, a new constitution was introduced, which provided for equal political rights throughout the whole canton.

The capital of Outer Schwyz alternated between Lachen and Einsiedeln.
