= Vernagt-Stausee =

Reservoir in Schnalstal, South Tyrol, Italy

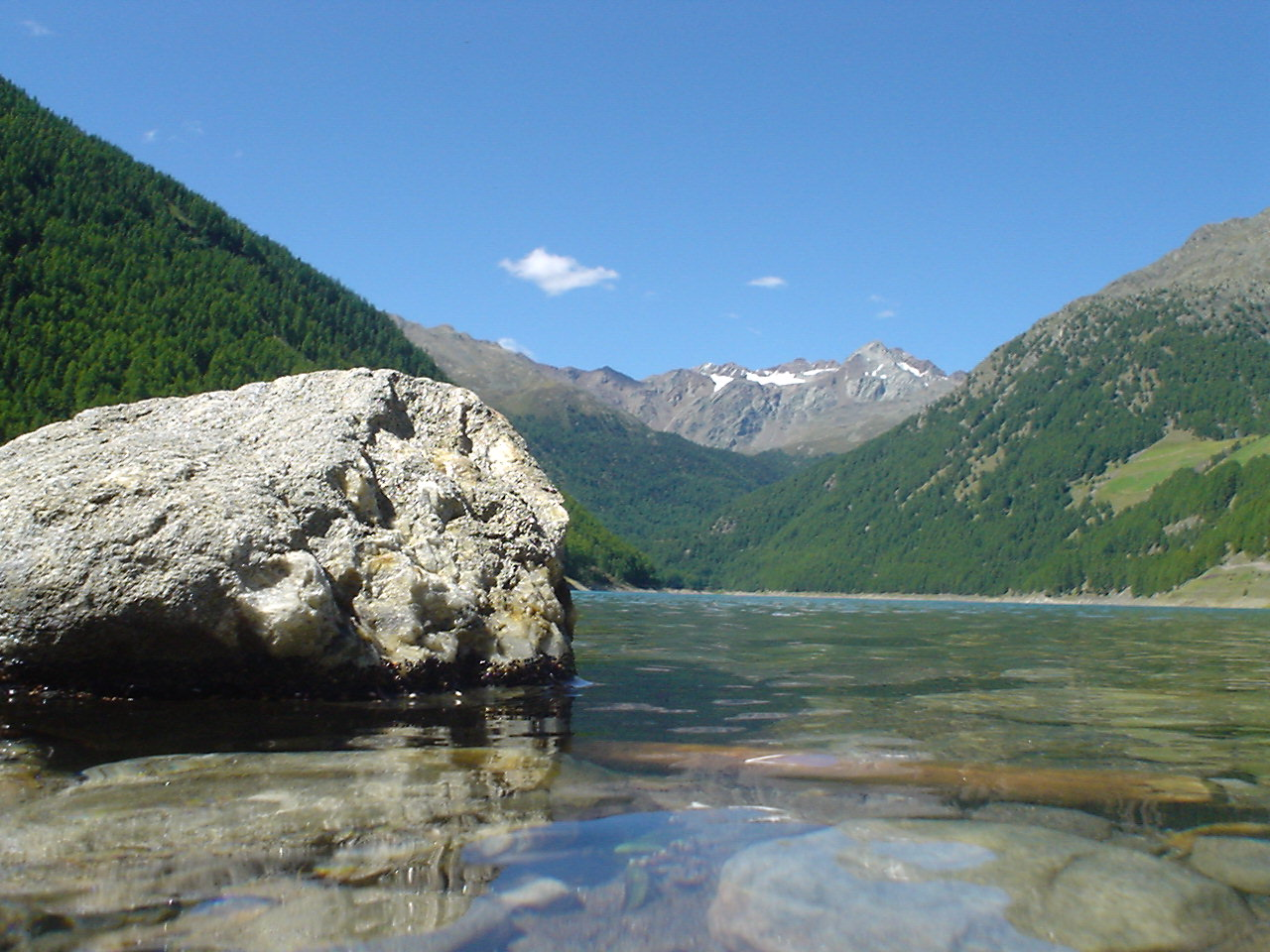

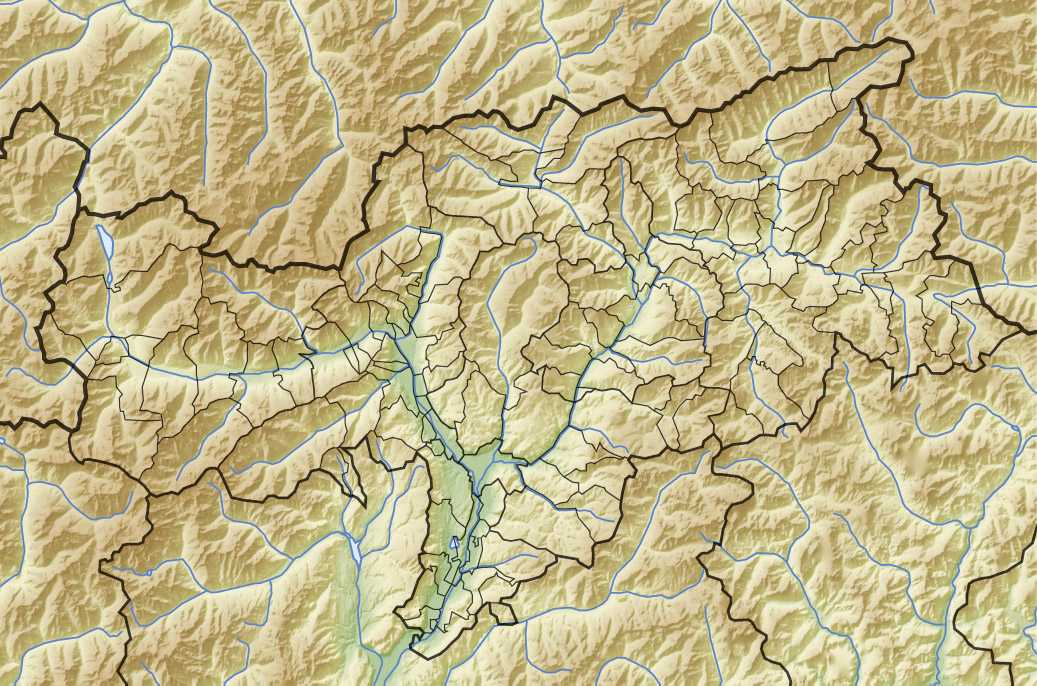
- Location within South Tyrol
- Location: South Tyrol
- Coordinates: 46°44′8″N 10°50′10″E
- Basin countries: Italy
- Surface area: Ca. 100 ha (250 acres)
- Surface elevation: 1,689 m (5,541 ft)

Lake Vernago or Vernagt-Stausee is a reservoir in Schnalstal, South Tyrol, Italy. Its water is used to generate electricity at the Etschwerke power station in the village of Naturns. The hamlet of Vernagt is situated on the bank of the reservoir.
