= Schnalstal =

Valley of South Tyrol, Italy

Coordinates: 46°43′20″N 10°51′39″E

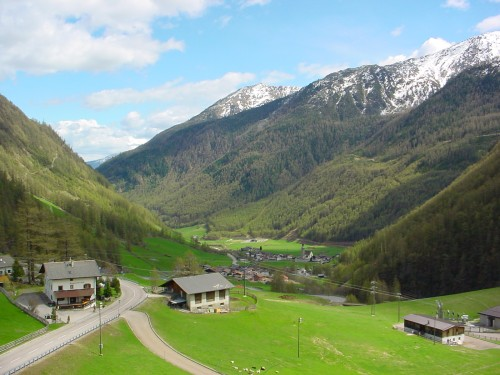
Schnalstal seen from Vernagt-Stausee Reservoir (March 2005)

The Schnalstal (Italian: Val Senales) is a side valley of the Vinschgau in the autonomous province of South Tyrol, Italy. It belongs almost in its entirety to the municipality of Schnals, while small parts in the entrance area lie in Naturns und Kastelbell-Tschars. The Vernagt-Stausee reservoir is located in the valley. Braunes Bergschaf, a rare breed of domesticated sheep, is raised there. In 1991, Ötzi -- a well-preserved natural mummy from about 3300 BC -- was found in the nearby Schnalstal glacier.
