= Roux du Valais =

Breed of sheep

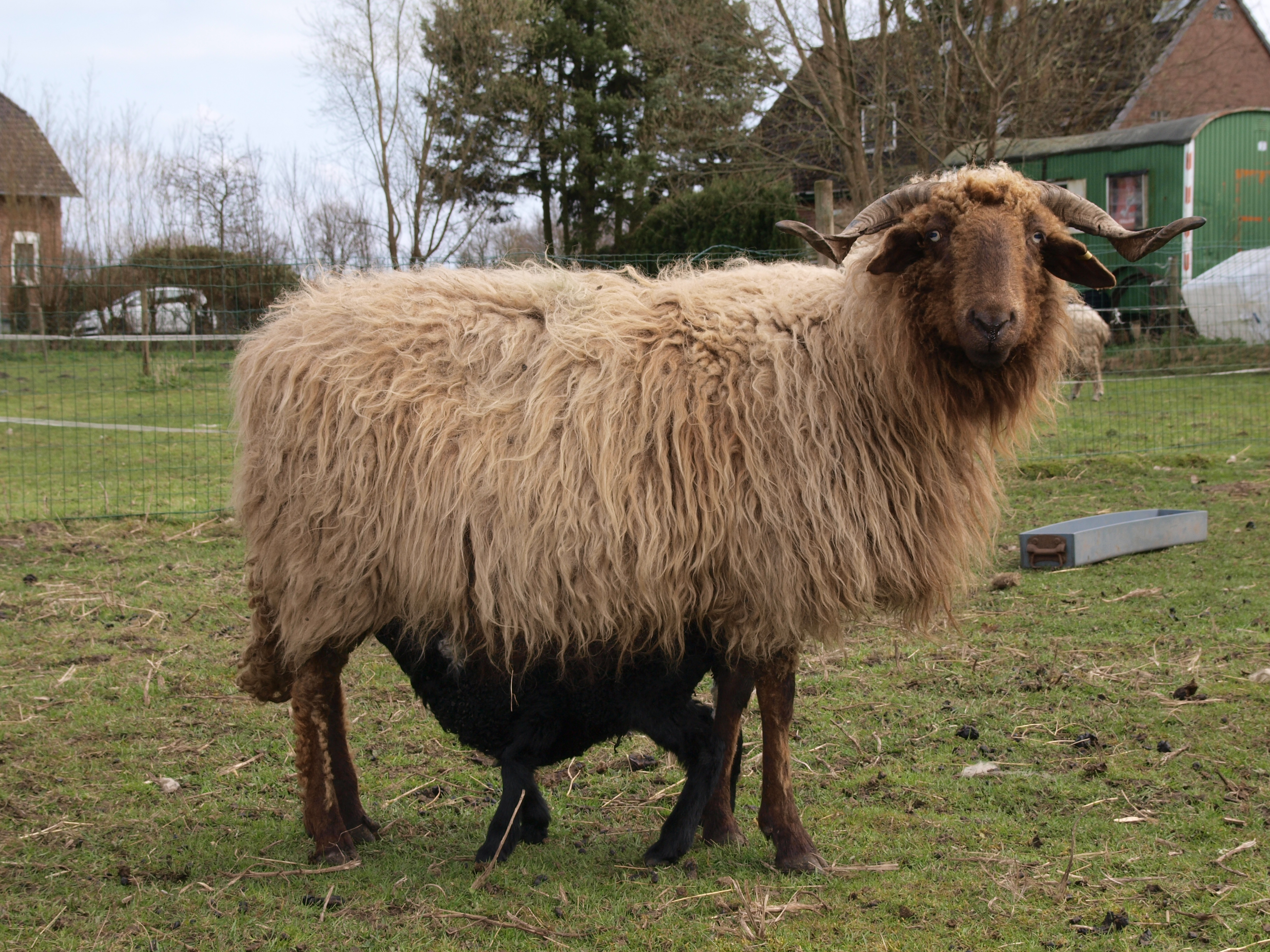
- A Roux du Valais ewe suckling a lamb
- Conservation status: Endangered
- Other names: Valais Red; Walliser Landschaf; Wallis Country Sheep
- Country of origin: Switzerland
- Use: Meat, Wool

Traits
- Weight: Male: 65-85 kg; Female: 50-65 kg
- Wool color: red-brown
- Horn status: Both sexes horned

The Roux du Valais is an endangered breed of sheep native to Switzerland.

== History and Usage ==
The Roux du Valais is indigenous to Switzerland, and has survived despite the extinction of many other indigenous Swiss sheep breeds. Its genetic is currently not known for certain, but it is believed to be related to the now-extinct Copper sheep, Roux du Bagnes, and Pilot sheep breeds.

The Roux du Valais is bred for both wool and meat. Its meat is of a good quality, and is very lean. Today, its wool is mainly used in specialty product, heavy-duty cloth. This is a fairly limited market due to the Roux du Valais's low population numbers. Historically, its wool was very popular in Switzerland for use in underwear and stockings, as it was presumed to have therapeutic qualities including the ability to cure rheumatism.

== Characteristics ==
The Roux du Valais is a medium-sized sheep, with males weighing about 65–85 kg and ewes 50–65 kg. It is a distinctive red-brown color, but there is also an extremely rare black variety known as the Lotschental. Both sexes are horned. The Roux du Valais mainly lives in the French-speaking areas of Switzerland, but has expanded into other areas in recent years. It is one of the few surviving breeds indigenous to Switzerland.

== Conservation status ==
The Roux du Valais is endangered, largely due to lack of interest in the breed in favor of faster growing breeds. It nearly became extinct in the 1980s, but a breeders association formed in 1994, The Swiss Breeding Association for Valais Rural Sheep, along with Pro Specie Rara, has helped improve the breed's genetics and seen its numbers rebound somewhat. The expansion of the breed into Romandie and German-speaking Switzerland has also helped its population increase. Still, there are estimated to be only about 1,000 Roux du Valais sheep left in the world.
