= Red Engadine =

Swiss breed of sheep

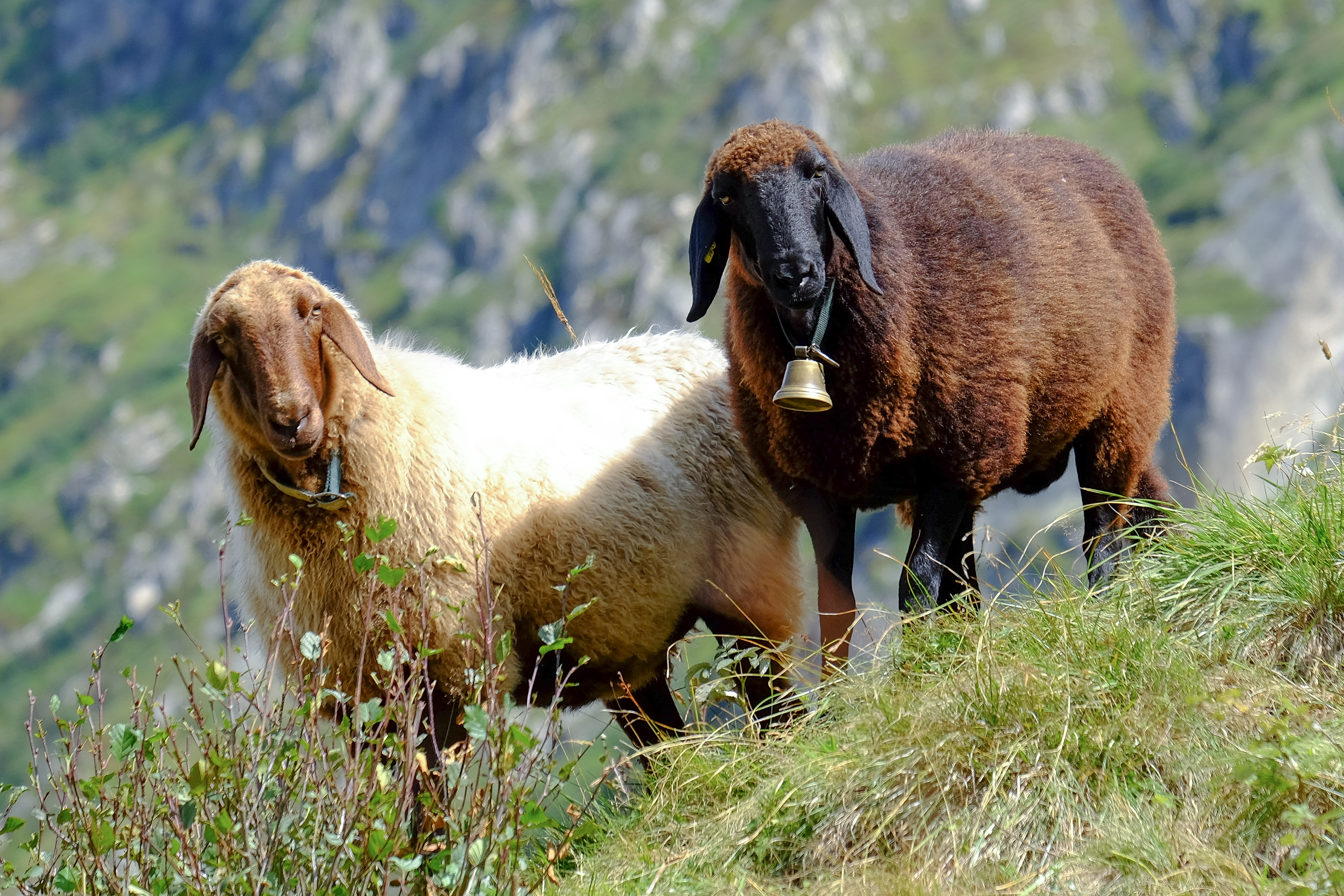
- Red Engadine in two colour variations, brown and black (Switzerland)
- Conservation status: FAO (2007): not at risk; DAD-IS (2020): at risk
- Other names: Romansh: Besch da Pader; Paterschaf; Engadinerschaf; Fuchsfarbenes Engadinerschaf; Engadiner Fuchsschaf; Engadiner Landschaf; Engadiner Schaf; Roux d'Engadine; Engadine Red
- Country of origin: Switzerland
- Distribution: Lower Engadine, parts of Bavaria and Tyrol
- Type: Alpine lop-eared
- Use: meat; vegetation control

Traits
- Weight: Male: 80–90 kg; Female: 60–65 kg
- Height: Male: average 75 cm; Female: average 68 cm
- Wool colour: fox-red
- Face colour: dark
- Horn status: polled

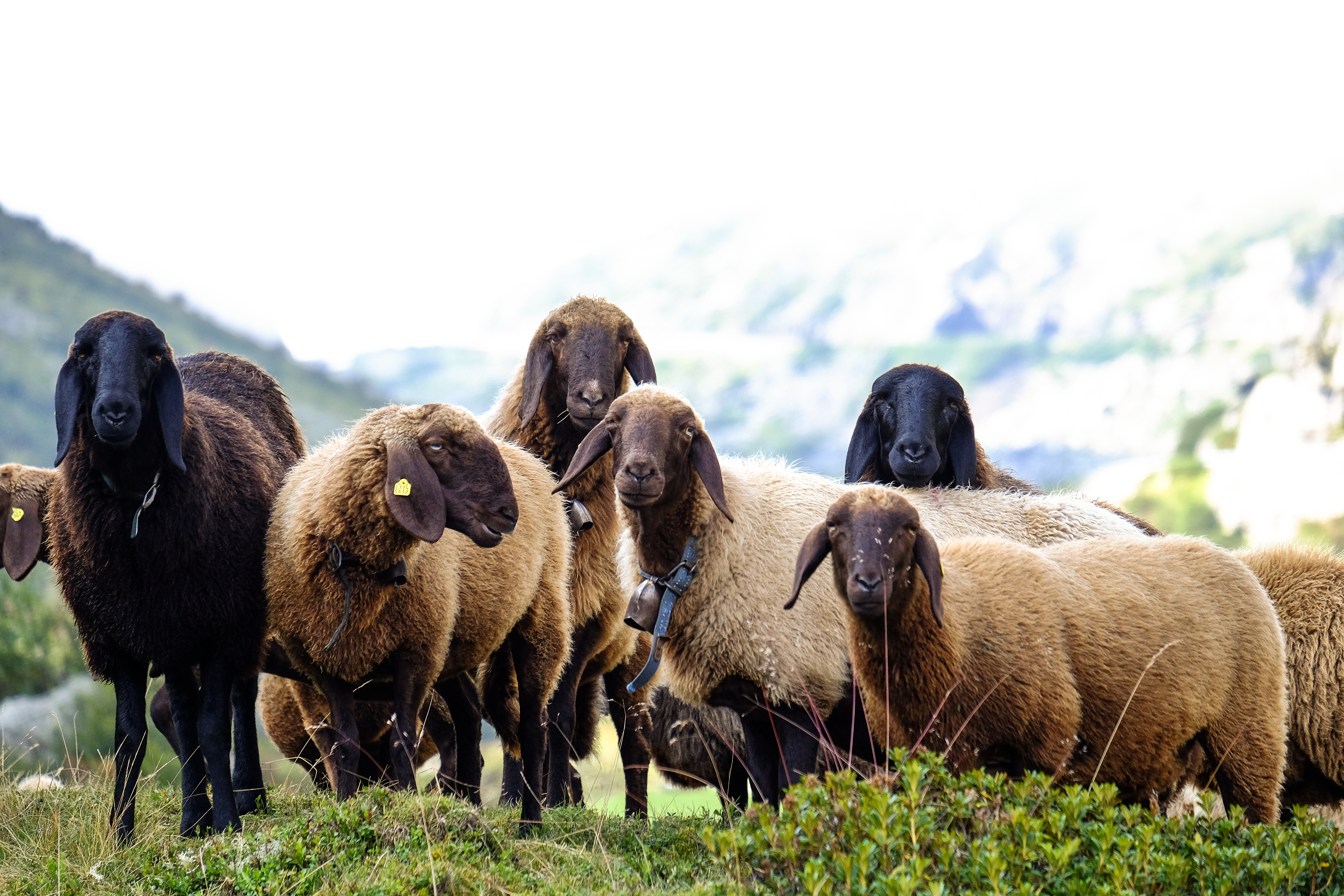
On the Alp Gamsboden

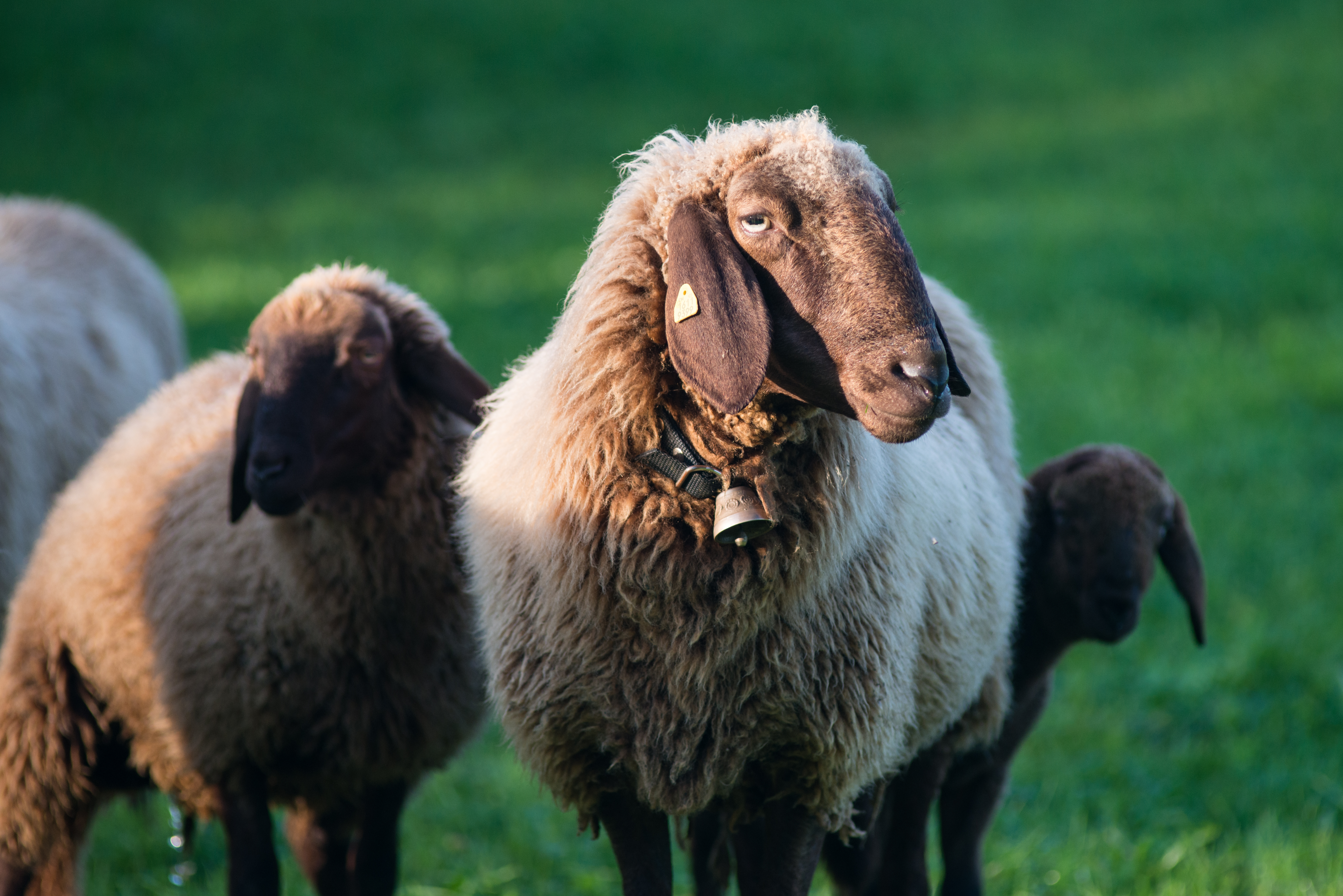
With lambs at St. Gallen

The Red Engadine or Engadine Red is a traditional Swiss breed of domestic sheep from the Lower Engadine valley and some neighbouring parts of Bavaria and Tyrol. It derives from cross-breeding of stock of Bergamasca and Alpines Steinschaf type. It is characterised by its convex profile, its fox-red wool and its long lop ears. In the 1980s it became gravely endangered, but has since recovered. It is a hardy mountain sheep; the hooves are strong and hard, and the breed is one of the few that are reported to have good resistance to foot rot.

== History ==
The Red Engadine is a long-established traditional mountain sheep breed of the Lower Engadine valley, in the canton of Graubünden in south-eastern Switzerland, and some neighbouring parts of Bavaria in Germany and Tyrol in Austria. It derives from cross-breeding of sheep similar to the modern Bergamasca, brought by Italian shepherds to the Alps of eastern Switzerland, with indigenous stock of Alpines Steinschaf type.

During the twentieth century it was gradually displaced by faster-growing breeds such as the Weisse Alpenschaf, and by the 1980s it was gravely endangered. With the assistance of ProSpecieRara, measures were taken to recover the breed: in 1985 a flock-book was started, and in 1992 a breed society, the Schweizerischer Engadinerschaf-Zuchtverein, was formed. Between 1992 and 2001 the recorded population rose from 40 breeding rams and 250 ewes to 136 rams and 1381 ewes. In 2007 the breed was listed by the FAO as "not at risk"; in 2020 its conservation status was reported to DAD-IS as "at risk".

== Characteristics ==
The Red Engadine is characterised by a convex profile, a fox-red coat, and long lop ears; the coat may fade in the sun. The face is dark, which together with the long drooping ears may give the animal a monkish appearance; this has given rise to names such as Romansh: Besch da Pader and German: Paterschaf for the breed.

It is a hardy mountain sheep; the hooves are strong and hard, and the breed is one of the few that are reported to have good resistance to foot rot.

== Use ==
The Red Engadine is reared principally for meat. It is slow-growing in comparison to some other breeds, but shows high prolificity – it is an aseasonal breeder, with a high twinning rate and short lambing interval of seven to eight months. The meat is of high quality and is low in fat.

Unlike more widespread breeds such as the Weisses Alpenschaf, it browses on woody stems as well as grass. It has been shown to be effective in limiting the spread of the invasive Alnus alnobetula (= Alnus viridis, "green alder") which threatens montane pasture land in the Alps and elsewhere.
