= Valais Blacknose =

Swiss breed of sheep

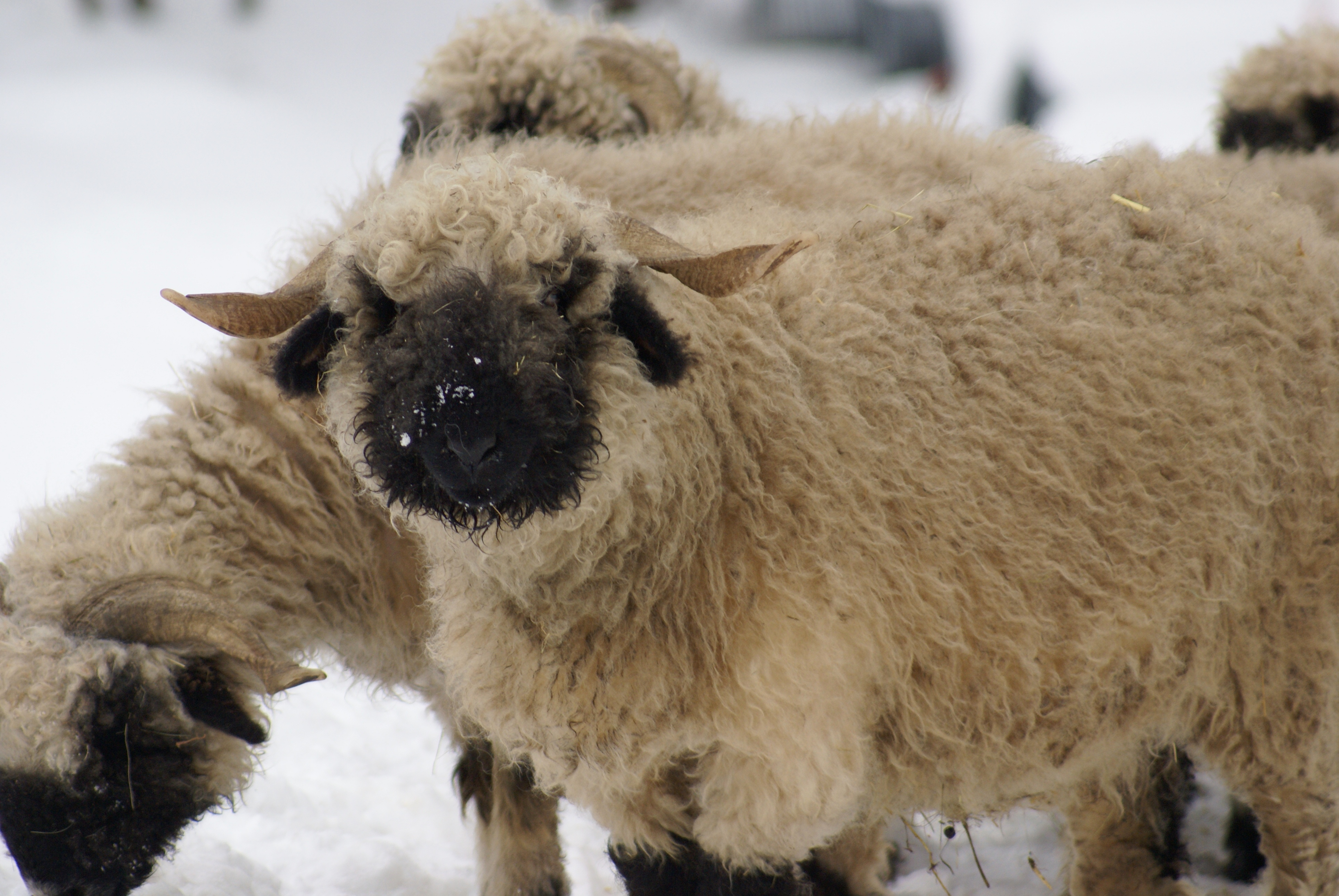
- Conservation status: FAO (2007): not at risk; DAD-IS (2024): not at risk
- Other names: Walliser Schwarznasenschaf
- Country of origin: Switzerland
- Distribution: Austria; Germany; The Netherlands
- Standard: Schweizerischer Schafzuchtverband
- Use: dual-purpose, meat and wool

Traits
- Weight: Male: 80–130 kg (180–290 lb); Female: 70–90 kg (150–200 lb)
- Height: Male: 75–83 cm (30–33 in); Female: 72–78 cm (28–31 in)
- Wool colour: white
- Face colour: black
- Horn status: horned in both sexes

The Valais Blacknose or Walliser Schwarznasenschaf is a breed of domestic sheep originating in the Valais region of Switzerland. It is a dual-purpose breed, raised both for meat and for wool.

== History ==
The breed originates in the mountains of the canton of Valais – from which its name derives – and of the Bernese Oberland. It is documented as far back as the fifteenth century, but the present German name was not used before 1884; the breed standard dates from 1962. In the past there was some cross-breeding with imported sheep: in the nineteenth century with Bergamasca and Cotswold stock, and in the twentieth century with the Southdown.

The Valais Blacknose is also present in Austria, Germany and the Netherlands. The total population reported in Switzerland for 2023 was 10286–19732, with 9380 ewes registered in the herd-book; the conservation status of the breed is listed as 'not at risk'.

== Characteristics ==
The Schwarznasenschaf is a mountain breed, well adapted to grazing on the stony pastures of its area of origin. Both rams and ewes are horned, with helical or spiral-shaped horns. Ewes may have black spots on the tail, but rams may not.

== Use ==
The Valais Blacknose is a dual-purpose breed, reared for both meat and wool. The wool is coarse: fibre diameter averages approximately 38 microns, and staple length is 100 mm (4 in) or more. The annual yield of wool is about 4 kg (10 lb) per head.

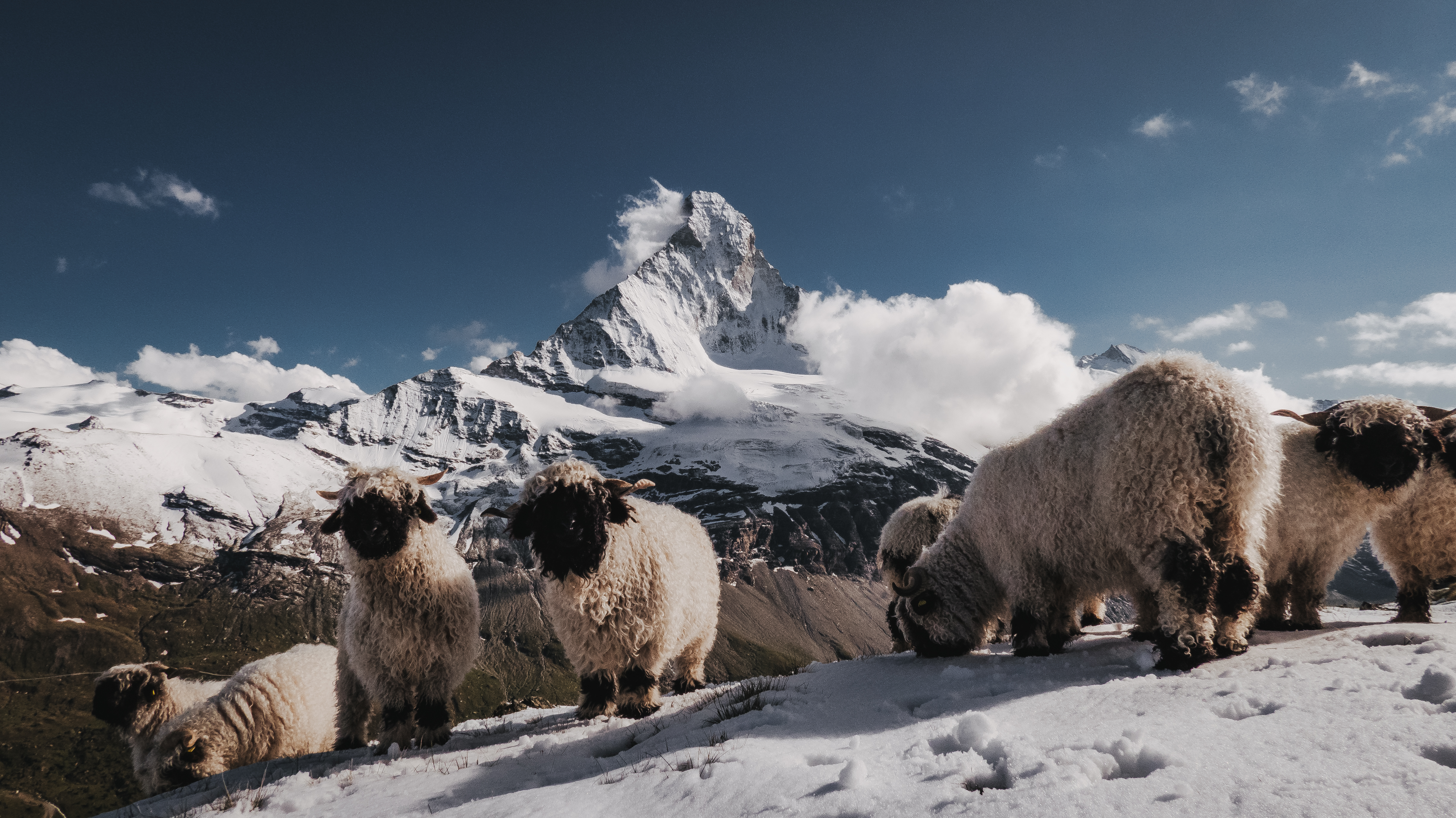
Near Zermatt, with the Matterhorn in the background
