= Schwarzbraunes Bergschaf =

Swiss breed of sheep

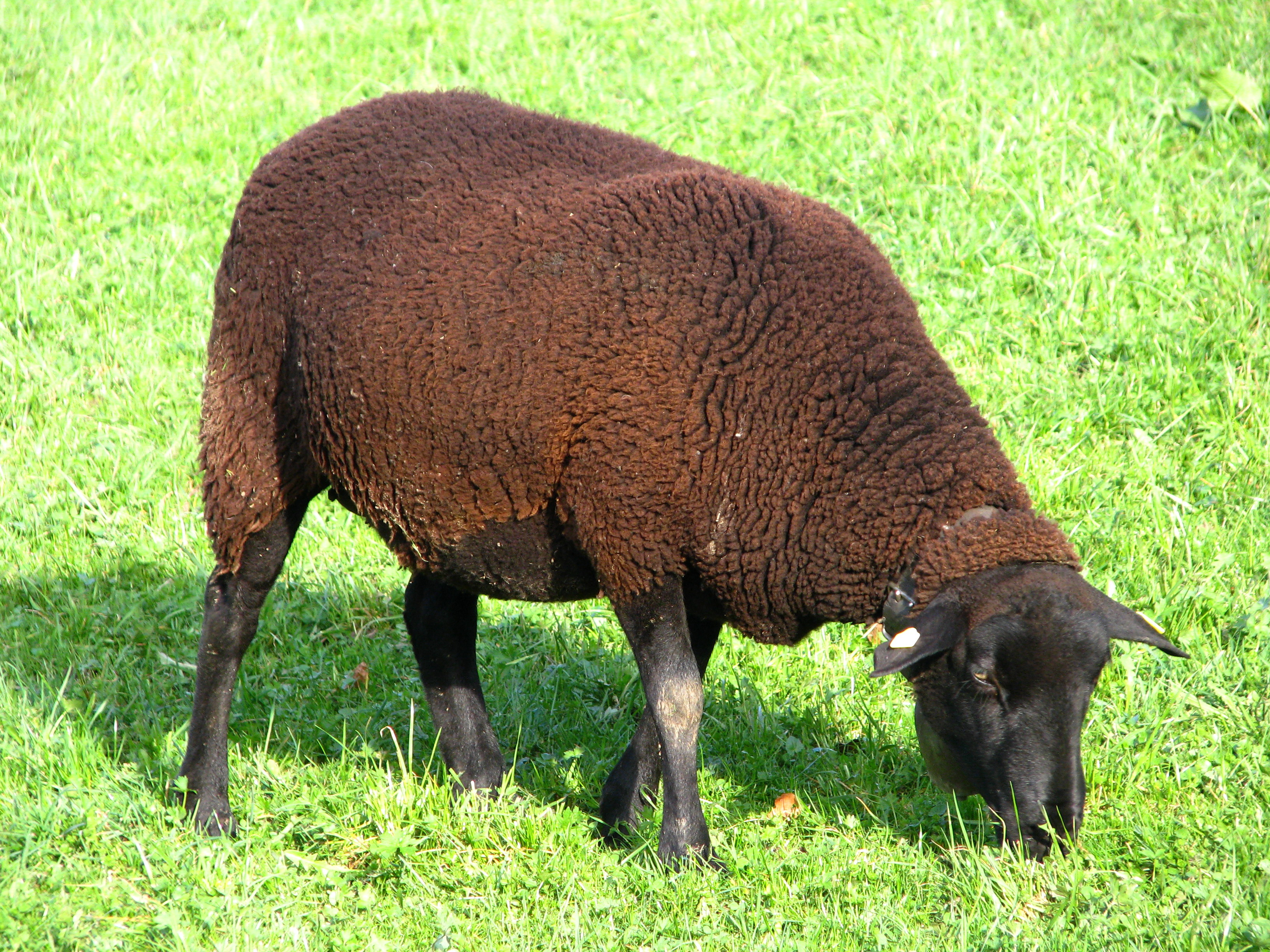
- Conservation status: FAO (2007): not at risk; DAD-IS (2025): not at risk
- Other names: Juraschaf; Elbschaf; Pecora del Giura; Pecora giurassica; Brun-noir du pays
- Country of origin: Switzerland
- Use: dual-purpose, meat and wool

Traits
- Weight: Male: 90–120 kg; Female: 65–90 kg
- Wool colour: black or brown
- Face colour: brown

The Schwarzbraunes Bergschaf is a Swiss breed of domestic sheep from the area of the Jura Mountains in Switzerland. It derives from the Swiss Frutigen, Jura, Roux-des-Bagnes, Saanen and Simmental breeds. The name means "black-brown mountain sheep". It is one of the four principal sheep breeds of Switzerland. It is present also in Austria, Germany and Italy, and in those countries is known as the Juraschaf.

The first official description is from 1925; the breed standard dates from 1941, and the herd-book was established in 1979. Numbers for the breed in 2008 were 14161 in Switzerland, 822 in Austria, 580 in Italy and 19 in Germany.

In Italy the Juraschaf is one of the forty-two autochthonous local sheep breeds of limited distribution for which a herd-book is kept by the Associazione Nazionale della Pastorizia, the Italian national association of sheep-breeders; the name "Schwarzbraunes Bergschaf" is used in Italy for the Braunes Bergschaf, a different breed.
