= Bündner Oberländerschaf =

Breed of sheep

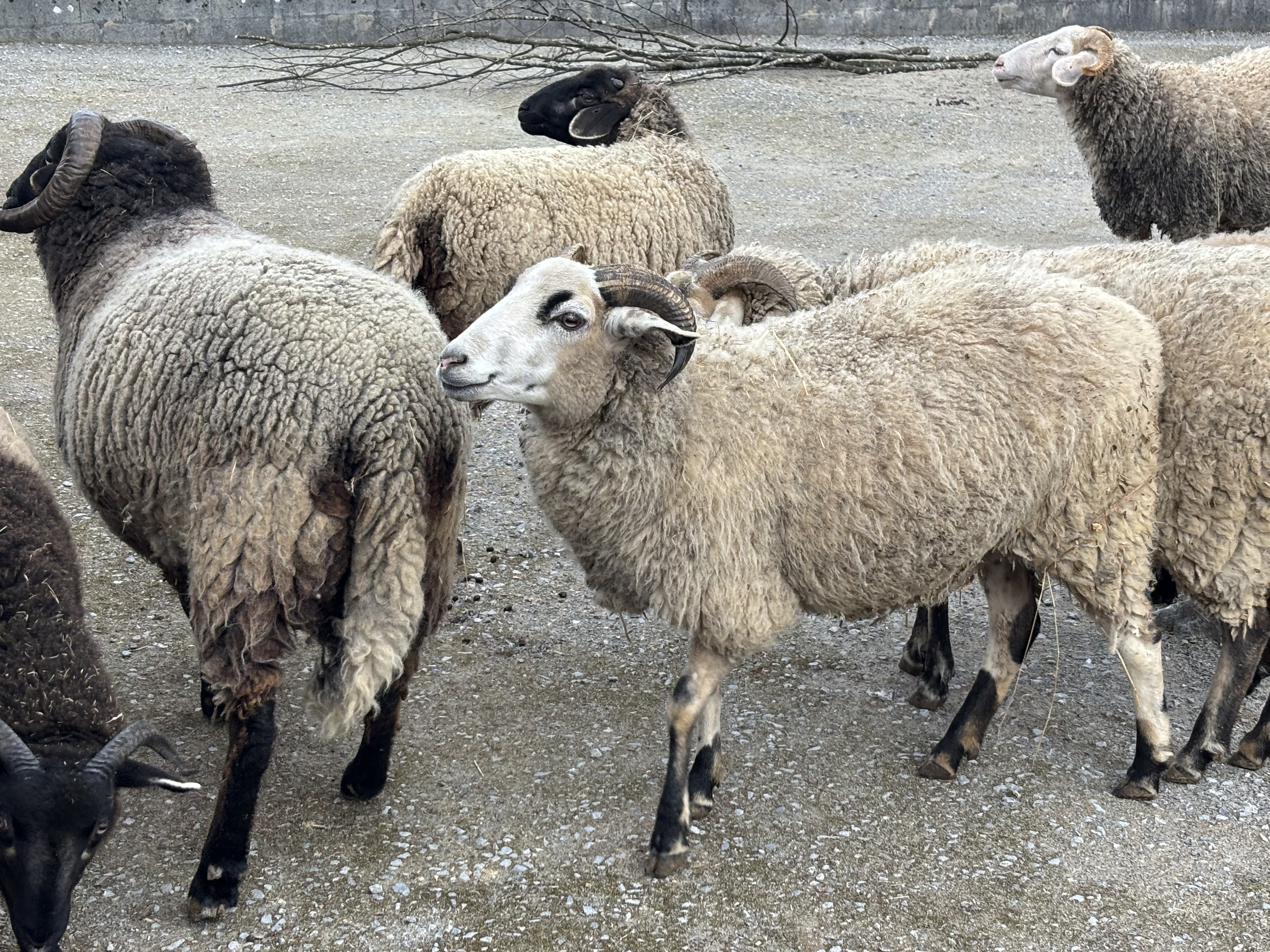
Bündner Oberländerschaft in the Zoo of Zürich

The Bündner Oberländerschaf (also known as Grisons (French), Graubünden (German)) is a domesticated breed of sheep in Switzerland. As of 2007, there were less than 1,100 but the population is increasing and used primarily for vegetation management.

== Characteristics ==
The Bündner Oberländerschaf displays white, brown or silver-grey. The head is slender and is bare. Rams have substantial horns while ewes have small horns or are polled (hornless). Both sexes display rather primitive behavior. Multiple births are common.

When mature, rams weigh on average 72 kg (160 lb) and ewes 50 kg (110 lb); rams stand about 72 cm (28 in) at the withers, and ewes 68 cm (27 in).
