= List of goat breeds =

Goats - farm animals of domestic goat (Capra hircus) species, small ruminants - are widespread throughout the world and are used in almost any natural and climatic conditions, even those where other productive animals cannot live. Different breeds of goats are adapted to different livestock systems - from small herds of 3-5 heads on meager grazing to large intensive livestock farms, from year-round grazing to fully stable housing, with many intermediate variations between them. Goats are a source of several types of products, of which the main ones are milk, meat and wool. Among the goat breeds there are highly productive specialized, dual-triple-use and universal breeds. External differences between breeds are represented by many major and minor traits that vary in a very wide range. Goat breeds (especially dairy goats) are some of the oldest defined animal breeds for which breed standards and production records have been kept. Selective breeding of goats generally focuses on improving production of fiber, meat, dairy products or goatskin. Breeds are generally classified based on their primary use, though there are several breeds which are considered dual- or multi-purpose.

== List ==
Name	Image	Other names	Origin	Purpose	References
Abaza		Abkhasian, Abkhazskaya	Turkey	milk, meat	
Abergelle			Ethiopia	milk, meat	
Afar		Abyssinian short-eared, Adal, Danakil	Ethiopia (Afar region)		
Agew			Ethiopia	milk, meat	
Agrupación de las Mesetas			Spain		
Albatinah		Aamil	Oman		
Algarvia			Portugal		
Aljabal Alakhdar			Oman		
Alpine		Alpine polychrome, American Alpine, French Alpine	French Alps	milk	
Altai Mountain			Altai Republic	fiber	
Adi Keçi			Turkey	fiber, milk	
Andaman local					
Anglo-Nubian		Nubian	Great Britain	meat, milk	
Angora			Central Anatolia Region	fiber	
Appenzell		Chèvre d’Appenzell, Appenzellerziege	Switzerland	milk	
Aradi		Aardi, A'ardiyah			
Arapawa		Arapawa Island Goat	Arapaoa Island	meat, milk	
Argentata dell'Etna			Sicily	milk	
Arsi-Bale			Ethiopia		
Asmari		Gujeri	Afghanistan	pack, meat, milk, fiber	
Aspromonte					
Assam Hill			India		
Aswad			Saudi Arabia		
Attappady black			India		
Attaouia			Morocco		
Auckland Island			Auckland Island	meat	
Australian brown			Australia		
Australian Cashmere			Australia	fiber	
Australian Heritage Angora			Australia		
Australian Melaan			Australia		
Australian Miniature	Australian Miniature Goat (adult female)		Australia	Pet, milk	
Azpi Gorri					
Azul			NE Brazil		
Bagot			England		
Banatian White			Banat		
Barbari			India, Pakistan	meat	
Beetal			Punjab region	meat, milk	
Belgian Fawn			Belgium	milk	
Benadir			Southern Somalia	meat, milk	
Bhuj			Northeastern Brazil	meat, milk	
Bilberry			Waterford		
Bionda dell'Adamello			Lombardy	milk	
Black Bengal			India, Bangladesh	meat, goatskin	
Boer		Africander, Afrikaner	South Africa	meat	
British Alpine			England	milk	
Brown Shorthair			Czech Republic	milk	
Canary Island		Agrupación caprina canaria	Canary Islands	milk	
Canindé			Northeastern Brazil	meat	
Carpathian			Southeast Europe	meat, milk	
Chyangra			Nepal (High mountains) Himalayas	Wool, meat	
Chamba			Himalaya	cashmere wool, meat	
Chamois Coloured		Chamoisée	Switzerland	meat, milk	
Changthangi		Bamar, Pashmina	Tibet, Southwest China, Myanmar	fiber, meat, milk	
Chappar			Sindh	meat	
Charnequeira			Portugal	meat, milk	
Chengde Polled			Northern Hebei	fiber, meat	
Chengdu Brown			Sichuan	meat, milk	
Chigu			India	fiber, meat	
Chué			Northeastern Brazil	meat	
Corsican			Corsica	milk	
Dera Din Panah			Pakistan	milk	
Damani			Pakistan	milk	
Damascus		Aleppo, Baladi, Chami, Damascene, Halep, Shami	Syria	milk	
Danish Landrace			Denmark	milk	
Don			Don River	milk, goatskin, fiber	
Drežnica			Slovenia	milk, meat	
Duan			Guangxi	meat	
Dutch Landrace			Netherlands	milk	
Dutch Toggenburg			Netherlands	milk	
Erzgebirge			Saxony	milk	
Fainting		Myotonic	United States	meat	
Flemish			Belgium	milk, meat	Vlaamse geit | Steunpunt Levend Erfgoed (sle.be)
Frisa Valtellinese			Italy	meat	
Finnish Landrace			Finland	milk	
Garganica		Agrigentina	Gargano	milk, goatskin	
Girgentana			Northern Afghanistan, Balochistan, and Kashmir	milk	
Göingeget			Sweden		
Golden Guernsey			Guernsey	milk	
Grisons Striped			Switzerland	milk	
Guddi			Himalayas		
Hailun			Heilongjiang	milk	
Haimen			Zhejiang	meat	
Hasi			Northeastern Albania	meat, milk	
Hejazi			Arabian Peninsula	meat	
Hexi Cashmere			Northern Gansu	fiber	
Hongtong			Hongdong County	milk	
Huaipi			Henan	meat	
Huaitoutala			Qinghai	Animal fiber	
Hungarian Improved			Hungary	milk	
Icelandic		Settlement	Iceland	fiber, meat	
Irish			Ireland	meat, milk	
Jamnapari		Jamunapari	India	milk	
Jining Grey			Shandong	fiber, goatskin	
Jonica			Province of Taranto	milk	
Kaachan			Pakistan	Milk+meat	
Kaghani			Hazara	meat	
Kalahari Red			South Africa	meat	
Kalbian	Charlie Goat (Pure Kalbian)		Australia	meat	
Kamori			Sindh	milk	
Kempic		Kempense	Belgium	milk	Kempense geit | Steunpunt Levend Erfgoed (sle.be)
Kinder			United States	meat, milk	
Kiko			New Zealand	meat	
Korean Black			Korea	meat	
Kri-kri		Cretan, Agrimi, or Cretan Ibex	Eastern Mediterranean	meat	
American Lamancha		Lamancha	United States	meat, milk	
Laoshan			Shandong	milk	
Majorera		Fuerteventura	Canary Islands	milk	
Malabari		Tellicherry goat	Malabar region	Meat, milk	
Maltese			Malta	milk	
Massif Central			France	milk, Meat	
Markhoz		Maraz	Kurdistan	Mohair, milk	
Messinese		Nebrodi	Province of Messina	milk	
Mini Oberhasli		Oberian, Miniature Oberhasli	Pacific Northwest US	milk	
Moxotó			Northeastern Brazil	meat	
Murcia-Granada		Murciano Granadina	Southeastern Spain	milk	
Murciana		Murcian, Murcien, Murciene, Royal Murciana	Murcia	meat, milk	
Nachi			Punjab region	meat	
Nigerian Dwarf			West Africa	milk	
Nigora			United States	fiber, milk	
Nera Verzasca			Switzerland	meat, milk	
Norwegian			Norway	meat, milk	
Oberhasli		Swiss Alpine	Oberhasli	milk	
Orobica			Bergamo Alps	milk	
Peacock			Switzerland	milk	
Pinzgauer			Austria	meat	
Philippine			Philippines	meat	
Poitou			Western France	milk	
Pridonskaya			Russia	milk, Meat, Wool	
Pygmy		African pygmy, American pygmy	Cameroon	meat, milk, Pet	
Pygora			Oregon City	fiber	
Pyrenean			France and Spain	meat, milk	
Qinshan			Jining	goatskin	
Red Mediterranean			Syria	milk	
Sokoto Red		Maradi Red, Red Sokoto	Nigeria and Niger Republic	Meat, Skin, milk	
Repartida			Northeastern Brazil	meat	
Rove			France	meat	
Russian White			Russia	milk	
Saanen			Saanen	milk	
Sable Saanen			United States	milk	
Sahelian		Sahel	Sahel Belt of West Africa	Meat	
Valdostana			Italy	meat, milk	
Sahelian			West Africa	Goatskin, meat, milk	
San Clemente Island			San Clemente Island		
Sarda			Sardinia	milk	
Short-eared Somali		Abgal			
Bering's Short-ear					
Sirohi		Ajmeri, Devgarhi, Parvatsari	Sirohi Ajmer, Nagaur, Tonk, Sikar, Jhunjhunu, Chitorgarh, Udaipur, Rajasamand, Bhilwara, Jaipur and other districts of Rajasthan (India)	Meat and milk	
Swedish Landrace			Northern Sweden	milk	
Somali			Somalia, Djibouti and northeastern Kenya	milk, meat, goatskin	
Spanish		Brush, scrub	United States	meat	
Stiefelgeiss			St. Gallen	meat	
Surati			Maharashtra		
Syrian Jabali		Syrian Mountain			
Tauernscheck			Austria	milk	
Thuringian			Thuringia	milk	
Toggenburg			Toggenburg	milk	
Uzbek Black			Uzbekistan	fiber	
Valais Blackneck			Southern Switzerland	meat, milk	
Vatani		Afghan native black			
Verata			La Vera, Spain	meat, milk	
West African Dwarf		African dwarf	West and Central Africa		
White Shorthaired			Czech Republic	milk	
Xinjiang			Xinjiang	fiber, meat, milk	
Xuhai			Jiangsu	meat	
Yemen Mountain			Yemen		
Zalawadi		Tara bakari	Gujarat	fiber, meat, milk	
Zhiwulin Black			Shaanxi	fiber, meat	
Zhongwei		Chung-wei, Chaungway, Chzhun'veiskaya	China	fiber, Pelt	

== Bibliography ==
- Ekarius, Carol (2008). Storey's Illustrated Breed Guide to Sheep, Goats, Cattle and Pigs. Storey Publishing. ISBN 978-1-60342-036-5.
- "Goat Breeds". Breeds of Livestock. Oklahoma State University Dept. of Animal Science. 19 January 2021.
- Introduction to Common Goat Breeds Mother Earth News
- Raising Goats for Dummies (Wiley, 2010)
