= Landrace (disambiguation) =

A landrace is a type of domestic animal or plant adapted to the natural and cultural environment in which it originated, with minimal selective breeding. Some have "landrace" in the names:

- Danish landrace duck
- Danish landrace goose

The term is also used informally in reference to cannabis plants to designate specific varieties, e.g. Colombian Gold, etc.; these are more properly cultivars, not landraces.

Capitalized, the term is also used in the name of several "Landrace breeds", selectively-bred, standardized breeds, derived wholly or in part from actual landraces:

Pigs

- American Landrace pig
- Belgian Landrace pig
- British Landrace pig
- Bulgarian Landrace pig
- Canadian Landrace pig
- Danish Landrace pig
- Dutch Landrace pig
- Finnish Landrace pig
- French Landrace pig
- German Landrace pig
- Italian Landrace pig
- Norwegian Landrace pig
- Polish Landrace pig
- South African Landrace pig
- Swedish Landrace pig
- Swiss Landrace pig

Geese

- Twente Landrace goose

Goats

- British Landrace goat, better known as the British Primitive goat or Old British goat; it subsumes earlier classifications:
  - English Landrace goat
  - Irish Landrace goat
  - Scottish Landrace goat
  - Welsh Landrace goat
- Danish Landrace goat
- Dutch Landrace goat
- Finnish Landrace goat
- Swedish Landrace goat

Sheep

- Danish Landrace sheep
- Finnish Landrace sheep, or Finnsheep
- Old Norwegian Short Tail Landrace, or Spælsau
