= List of Iberian goat breeds =

This is a list of the breeds of goat usually considered to originate in Spain and Portugal.

- Algarvia
- Azpi Gorri
- Bermeya
- Blanca Celtibérica
- Blanca Serrana Andaluza
- Blanca de Rasquera
- Bravia
- Cabra Galega
- Cabra de las Mesetas
- Charnequeira
- Del Guadarrama
- Eivissenca
- Florida
- Jurdana
- Majorera
- Malagueña
- Mallorquina
- Moncaína
- Murciano-Granadina
- Negra Serrana
- Palmera
- Payoya
- Pirenaica
- Pitiüsa
- Preta de Montesinho
- Retinta
- Serpentina
- Serrana
- Tinerfeña
- Verata

== See also ==
- Spanish (American goat breed)
