= Jonica =

Breed of goat

- Conservation status: FAO (2007): not at risk
- Country of origin: Italy
- Distribution: Province of Taranto; Murge; Province of Catanzaro; Province of Lecce; Province of Matera; Province of Reggio Calabria
- Standard: MIPAAF
- Use: milk

Traits
- Weight: Male: 68 kg; Female: 48 kg
- Height: Male: 78 cm; Female: 70 cm
- Skin colour: unoigmented
- Hair colour: white
- Face colour: white
- Horn status: both sexes occasionally horned
- Goat; Capra aegagrus hircus

The Jonica is an Italian breed of domestic goat from the province of Taranto, in Puglia in southern Italy. Its origins are uncertain; it is thought to derive from crossing of local varieties with the Maltese breed. It is one of the eight autochthonous Italian goat breeds for which a genealogical herd-book is kept by the Associazione Nazionale della Pastorizia, the Italian national association of sheep-breeders.

In 1998 the total number of the goats was estimated at 20000 head. At the end of 2013 the registered population was 232.

== Use ==
It is reared principally for milk. The annual milk yield for pluriparous nannies is some 450–500 litres in a lactation of some 250–270 days; most of it used to make canestrati or cacioricotta.
