= Verata =

Verata may refer to:

- Verata (district), a political division in the province of Tailevu, in Fiji
- Verata (goat breed)
