= Swedish Landrace =

Swedish Landrace may refer to:

- Swedish Landrace goat, a breed of goat
- Swedish Landrace pig, a breed of pig
