= Irish goat =

Breed of goat

Irish Goat
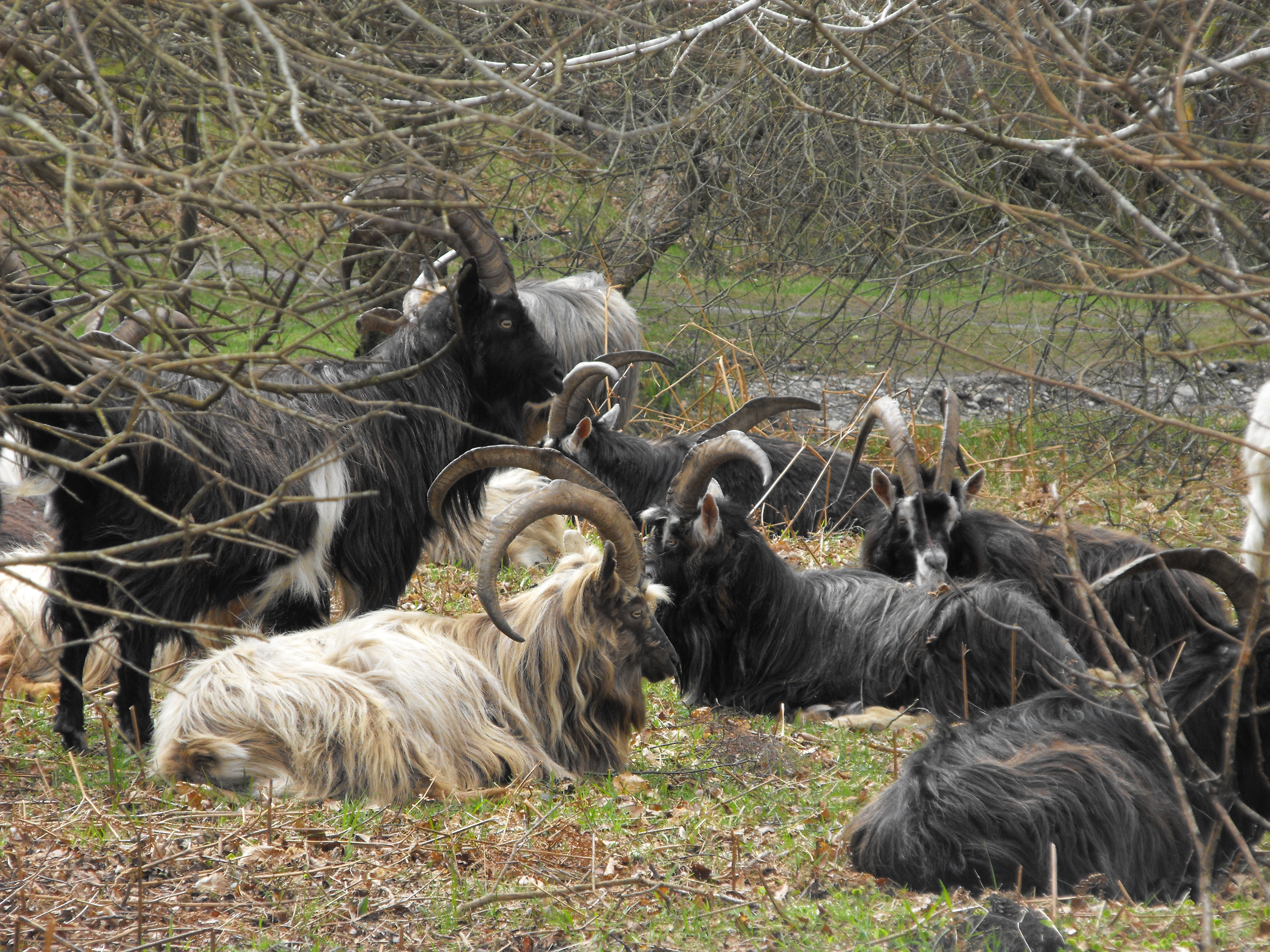
- Near Glendalough
- Conservation status: FAO (2007): not at risk; DAD-IS (2019): at risk
- Country of origin: Ireland
- Distribution: country-wide
- Use: meat; milk

Traits
- Weight: Male: 85 kg; Female: 55 kg
- Height: Male: 90 cm; Female: 80 cm
- Horn status: horned in both sexes
- Beard: yes
- Goat; Capra aegagrus hircus

The Irish Goat is a traditional Irish breed of domestic goat. It is a dual-purpose breed, used both for meat and for milk. It is an endangered breed and may survive only in feral populations. It is distinct from the feral Bilberry Goat of Waterford.

== History ==
The Irish Goat is the traditional domestic goat of Ireland. A herd-book was started in 1918.

In 1994 a breed population of 6650 was reported to the DAD-IS breed database of the Food and Agriculture Organization of the United Nations, and in 2007 its conservation status was listed by the FAO as "not at risk". It has since become an endangered breed: in 2019 breed numbers were reported to be 25–30, and conservation status was "at risk". According to The Old Irish Goat Society, it survives only in feral populations and is extinct in domesticity. It was not on the goat watchlist of the Rare Breeds Survival Trust in 2019.

== Characteristics ==
The Irish Goat is long-haired, bearded and horned in both sexes; the hair may be black, grey or white.
