= Maltese goat =

Maltese goat or Maltese Goat may refer to:

- the Capra Maltese, an Italian breed of goat
- the Mogħża Maltija, a Maltese breed of goat
