= White Russian Americans =

White Russian Americans may refer to:

- Belarusian Americans
- White émigrés, Russian subjects who emigrated for political reasons during the 20th century

== See also ==
- White Russian (disambiguation)
- Russian Americans
