= Aspromontana =

Breed of goat

- Conservation status: FAO (2007): no data
- Other names: Capra dell'Aspromonte; Aspromonte Goat
- Country of origin: Italy
- Distribution: Province of Reggio Calabria
- Standard: MIPAAF
- Use: dual-purpose, milk and meat

Traits
- Weight: Male: 64 kg; Female: 43 kg
- Height: Male: 73 cm; Female: 69 cm
- Skin colour: grey-black or pink according to hair colour
- Coat: very variable
- Horn status: usually horned
- Beard: usually bearded
- Tassels: usually present
- Goat; Capra aegagrus hircus

The Aspromontana or Capra dell'Aspromonte is an Italian breed of domestic goat indigenous to the mountain massif of the Aspromonte – for which it is named – in the province of Reggio Calabria, in Calabria in southern Italy. It is raised only in the province of Reggio Calabria, mainly in the Aspromonte, in the Altipiano dello Zomaro to the north-east, and in the Ionian coastal areas of the province, and particularly in areas of Grecanic culture. While the breed is thought to originate on the Aspromonte, it may have been influenced by the various other goat breeds, including the Abyssinian goat, the Maltese, and a type known as "Tibetan" with long silky hair, whose importation to Calabria in the early twentieth century is well documented.

The Aspromontana is one of the forty-three autochthonous Italian goat breeds of limited distribution for which a herdbook is kept by the Associazione Nazionale della Pastorizia, the Italian national association of sheep- and goat-breeders. At the end of 2013 the registered population was variously reported as 27164 and as 26249.

== Characteristics ==
The Aspromontana is of medium size, standing about 70 cm (28 in) at the withers; average weight is 64 kg (140 lb) for billies and 43 kg (95 lb) for nannies. The head is small, with a straight profile. Horns, beard and tassels are usually present in both sexes. The horns are lyre-shaped, larger in the male, and often broad and flattened at the base. The hooves are dark slate-grey.

The hair is long, rough in billies and somewhat smoother in nannies, with a soft undercoat. The coat colour is highly variable: red (phaeomelanic) is most common, but bi-coloured red-and-white, black-and-white or brown-and-red, solid grey or brown and belted variants also occur.

The annual fertility rate (percentage of matings that result in a birth) is 98%; average age of first parturition of 15 months.

Breeding goals are to improve prolificity (twinning rate) and the yield and quality of meat and milk. Some conformational defects, such as crop ear, are tolerated, while others, such as a short coat or a coarse or heavy head, are not.

The goats are well adapted to the harsh climatic and environmental conditions of their mountain habitat.

== Use ==
The Aspromontana is a dual-purpose goat, raised both for meat and for milk. It is a frugal and hardy breed, and has an important role in vegetation management and maintenance of the mountain pastures of the Aspromonte massif, thus contributing to fire prevention, soil stability and the conservation of local biodiversity and the ecosystem.

The minimum milk yield of Aspromontana nannies is 120 kg in 150 days for primiparous, 130 kg in 160 days for secondiparous and 180 kg in 210 days for pluriparous animals. Reported averages are, respectively, 140 kg in 150 days, 150 kg in 160 days, and 220 kg in 210 days. The milk averages 3.95% fat, 3.57% protein and 4.63% lactose, and is used to make local cheeses of many kinds. These include, among others, caciotta, cacioricotta, canestrato dell'Aspromonte, caprino dell'Aspromonte, caprino di Limina, giuncata di capra, musulupu dell'Aspromonte, mixed-milk cheeses such as caciocavallo di Ciminà, and various kinds of fresh, baked, smoked or salted ricotta. Many of these have PAT status as traditional products of the area.

Consumption of goat's meat, particularly that of adult nannies, is markedly higher in the province of Reggio Calabria than anywhere else in Italy. Calabrian goat's meat has PAT status, and there are numerous traditional local goat's-meat dishes. Aspromontana kids weigh about 3.2 kg at birth, and reach 9 kg at 30 days.
