= Laoshan =

Laoshan may refer to the following in China:

- Laoshan District (崂山区), in Qingdao, Shandong
- Mount Lao (崂山), mountain in Qingdao
- Laoshan Subdistrict (老山街道), division of Shijingshan District, Beijing
- The Laoshan (goat) breed of goat from Shandong
