= Finnish Landrace =

The term Finnish Landrace can refer to any of the following breeds of livestock originating in Finland:

- Finnish Landrace sheep, or Finnsheep
- Finnish Landrace goat
