= Poitou goat =

Breed of goat

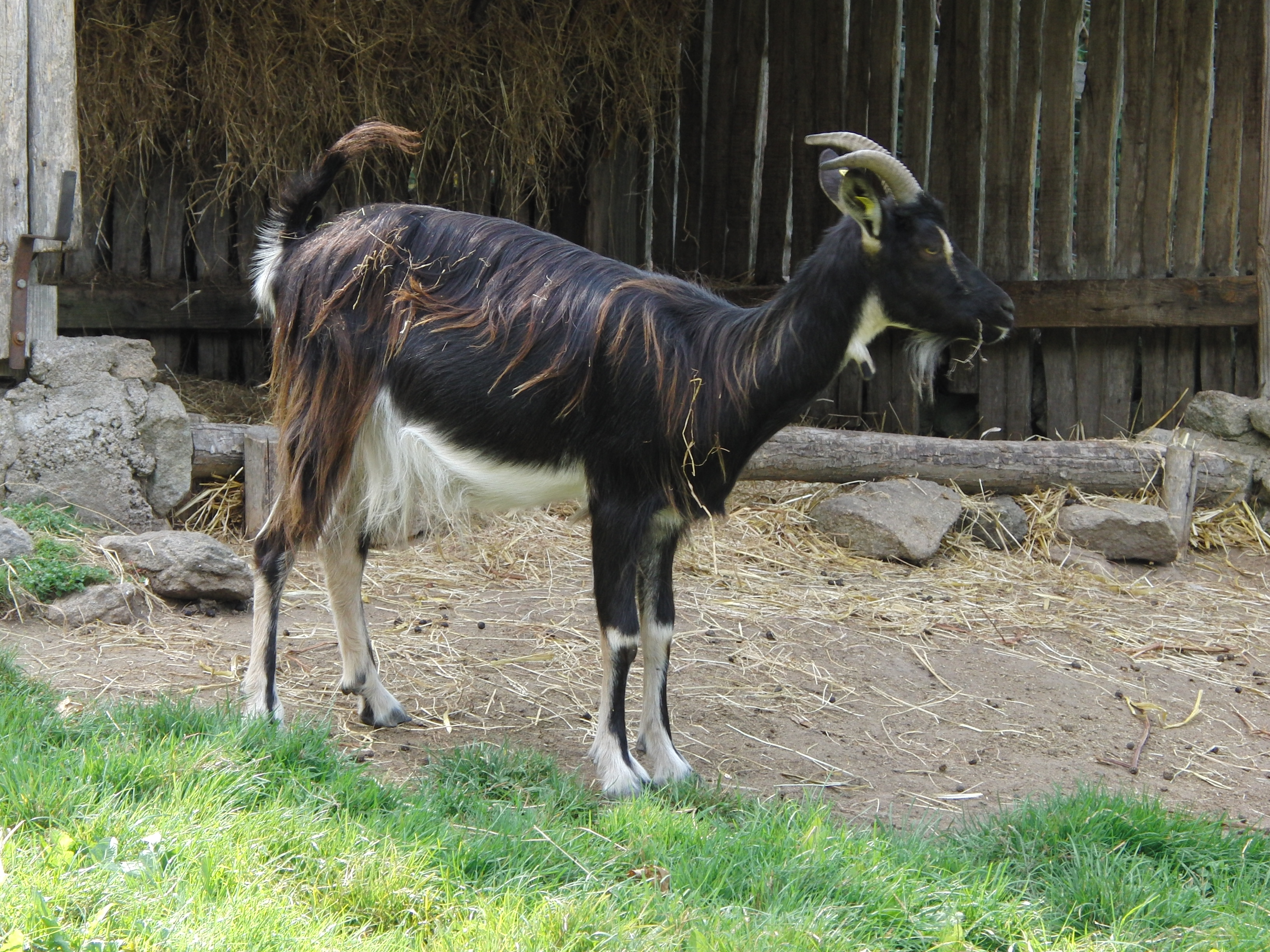
A Poitou goat

The Poitou goat (French: Chèvre Poitevine) is a dairy goat breed from western France. With a history dating back to 1800, the breed is named for the Poitou historic province. Poitou goats are known for their use in goat milk cheese production, though they are an endangered breed, and at one point were down to just 600 breeding animals. Poitou goats have a distinctive appearance: tall and with long, shaggy hair, they are black-brown with white marks on the head and neck, while the underbelly and legs are white.

== See also ==
- List of goat breeds
