= Canindé goat =

Breed of goat

The Canindé goat breed, from northeastern Brazil, was selectively bred for its characteristic coloration from the Chué goat of the same region. It is predominantly black with light stripes on its face, chest, and lower legs.

== Sources ==
Canindé Goat
