= Sahelian goat =

African breed of goat

Sahelian
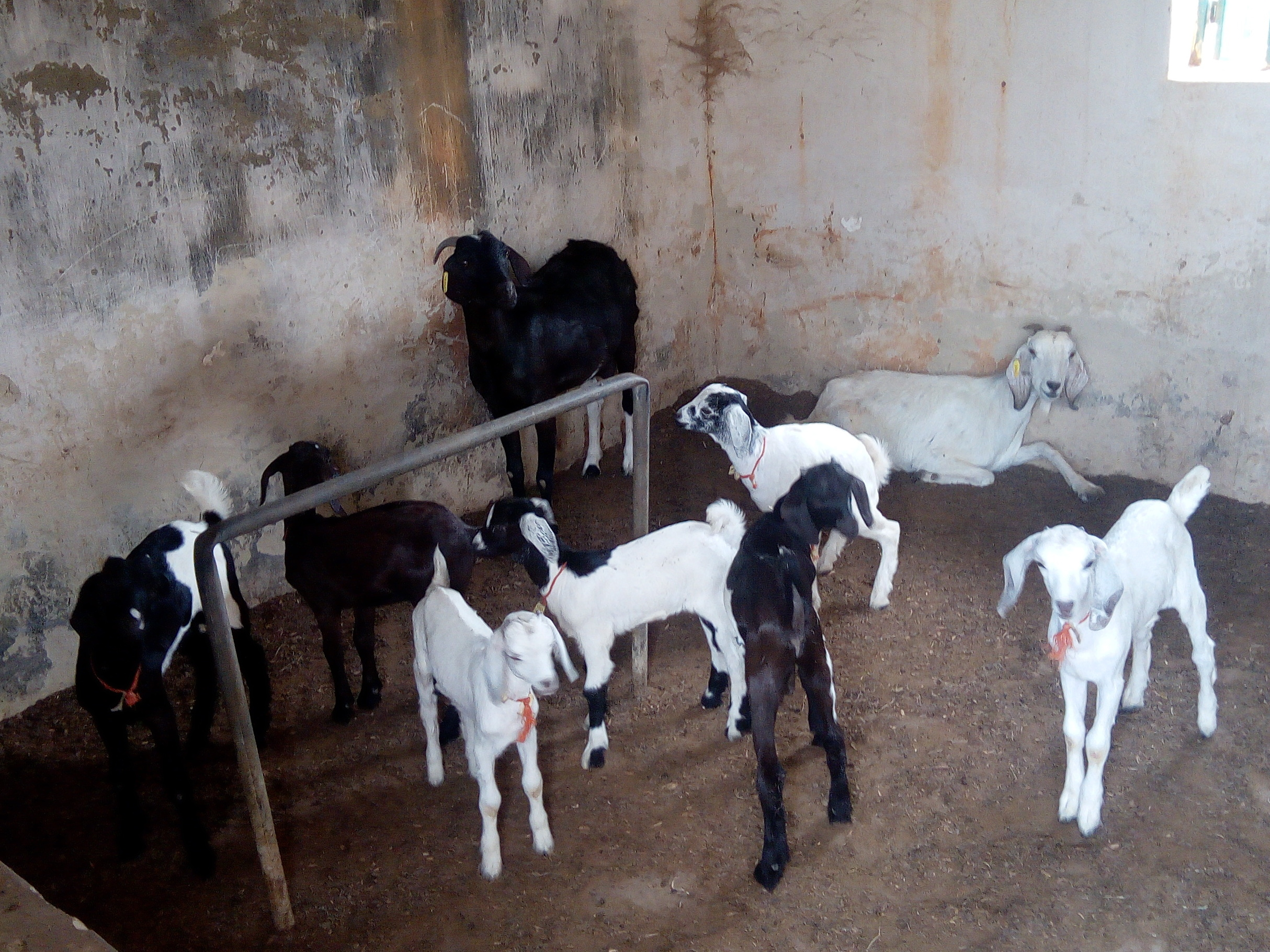
- Conservation status: FAO (2007): not at risk; DAD-IS (2024): not at risk
- Other names: Arab; Arabe; Arabi; Arabia; Bariolée du Sahel; Batha; Chèvre Bariolée; Chèvre du Sahel; Chèvre du Sahel Burkinabé; Fulani; Gorane; Kanem; Lac; Massakori; Maure; Mayo Kebbi; Moussoro; Niafounké; Nioro; Peul; Sahel; Somali Arab; Touareg; Voltaïque; West African Long-legged; Western
- Distribution: eleven African countries; Iran
- Use: meat; skin; milk

Traits
- Weight: Male: 40 kg; Female: 27 kg
- Height: 70–80 cm
- Horn status: horned in both sexes
- Beard: often present
- Tassels: often present
- Goat; Capra aegagrus hircus

The Sahelian is an African breed or group of breeds of domestic goat. It is used to produce meat, goatskin and milk. It is distributed in eleven African countries, principally in the Sahel region from which the name derives, but also in other parts of Africa – in the Central African Republic, in Ghana, in Somalia and in Togo; it is also present in Iran. The largest population is reported from Mali, where in 2015 there were about 35 million head, or about 75% of the total population of almost 48 million.

== History ==
Although domestication of the goat took place in Asia, the Sahelian – like other most African goat breeds – is considered indigenous to the African continent, as it has developed there over some thousands of years. It falls within the broader grouping of Savanna goats, which also includes numerous Saharan goats from Egypt and the Maghreb. Its principal range extends from the Atlantic coast of Mauretania eastward as far as central Chad, and lies mainly to the north of the 12th or 14th parallel. It is kept mostly in nomadic herds, in arid or semi-desert biomes.
