= Kiko goat =

New Zealand breed of goat

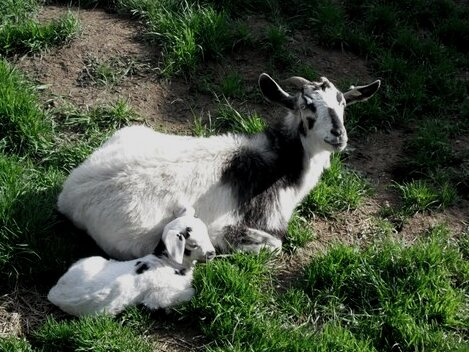
- Country of origin: New Zealand
- Distribution: New Zealand; United States; Pacific Islands
- Use: meat

Traits
- Skin colour: variable
- Horn status: horned or polled
- Beard: bearded
- Goat; Capra aegagrus hircus

The Kiko is a New Zealand breed of meat goat. The name derives from the Māori word for meat. It was bred in the 1980s by Garrick and Anne Batten, who cross-bred local feral goats with imported dairy goat bucks of the Anglo-Nubian, Saanen, and British Toggenburg breeds. The only aims of the breeding programme were fast rate of growth and ability to survive in the pastoral conditions of the New Zealand hill country.

== In the United States ==
Some stock was exported in 1992 by Goatex Group to the United States, where various breed associations have been formed. The goats are used principally for cross-breeding with stock of other meat breeds, most often the Boer. Cross-bred goats may be registered, but only animals deriving exclusively from New Zealand parentage may be registered as "New Zealand Kiko".
