= Surati goat =

Indian breed of goat

The Surati or Surti is an Indian breed of goat. It is distributed in north-western Maharashtra and in southern Gujarat. It may also be known as the Khandeshi, Kunyi or Nimari.

Its yield of milk and meat is very low: nannies give an average of 178 litres of milk in a lactation averaging 166 days; kids reach a weight of about 23 kg in the first year of life.
