= Moxotó =

Breed of goat

The Moxotó goat breed from northeastern Brazil is used for the production of meat. It is a color type selected from the Chué goat breed.

== Sources ==
- Moxotó Goat
