= White Russia =

White Russia, White Russian, or Russian White may refer to:

== White Russia ==
- White Ruthenia, a historical reference for a territory in the eastern part of present-day Belarus (as the term Rus' is often conflated with its Latin forms Ruthenia and Russia)
- An archaic literal translation for Belarus (White Ruthenia)/Byelorussia/Belorussia
- Russian State, opposed to the Soviet ("Red") Russia, one of the sides in the Russian Civil War

== White Russian ==
- A member of the White movement during the Russian Civil War
- A White émigré from the Russian Civil War
- "White Russian", a song by Marillion from their 1987 album Clutching at Straws
- The White Russian, a 2003 novel by Tom Bradby
- The White Russians, an Australian band fronted by Pinky Beecroft
- White Russian (cocktail), a cocktail made with vodka, coffee liqueur and cream

== Russian White ==
- Russian White, Black, and Tabby, breeds of cat
- Russian White goat

== See also ==
- Red Russia (disambiguation)
- European Russia
- Russians (East Slavic ethnic group)
