= Dutch Toggenburg =

Breed of goat

The Dutch Toggenburg goat breed was developed in the Netherlands from crosses between Dutch Landrace goats and the Toggenburg goat. It is used for the production of milk.

== Sources ==
- Dutch Toggenburg
