= Chamba goat =

Breed of goat

Chamba is a Goat breed from the Himalayan region that has white and soft hair.

== See also ==
- List of goat breeds
