= Sirohi goat =

Indian breed of goat

Sirohi
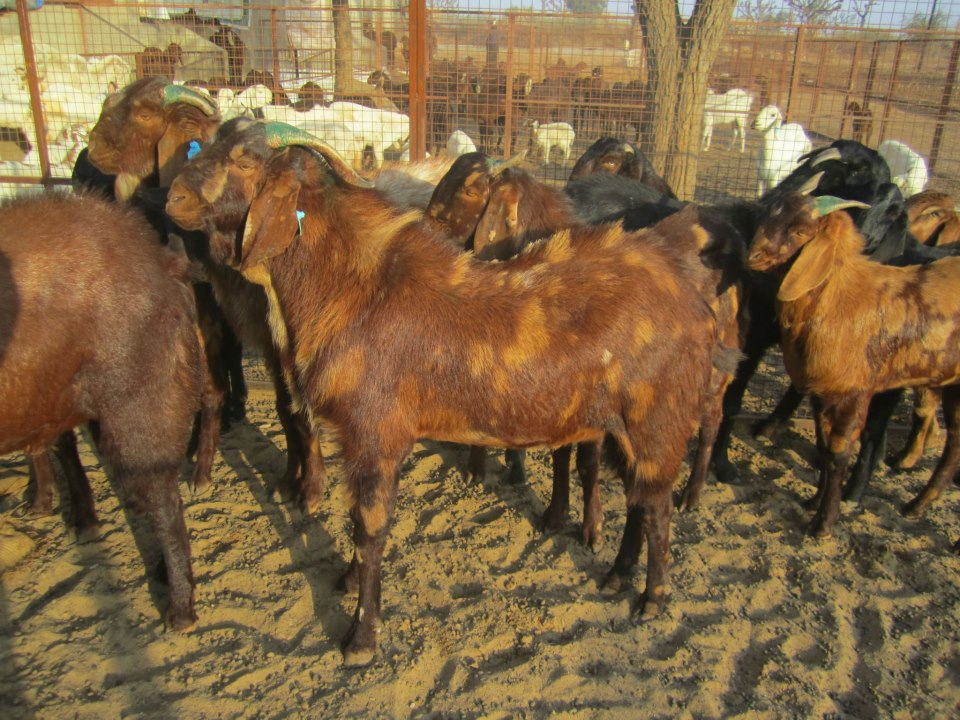
- Spotted Sirohi billies
- Conservation status: FAO (2007): not at risk; DAD-IS (2021): not at risk
- Country of origin: India
- Distribution: Rajasthan; Gujarat
- Use: meat, milk

Traits
- Weight: Male: 50 kg; Female: 23 kg
- Height: Male: 86 cm; Female: 68 cm
- Horn status: small back-curved horns in both sexes
- Tassels: usually present
- Goat; Capra aegagrus hircus

The Sirohi is an Indian breed of domestic goat. It is named for its area of origin, the Sirohi District of Rajasthan, in north-western India. It may be described as a dual-purpose breed, reared for both meat and milk production, or as meat breed. It is well adapted to the dry tropical climate of Rajasthan.

== History ==
The Sirohi is believed to have originated in the Sirohi District of southern Rajasthan, its principal area of distribution. Its range extends southward into the neighbouring Palanpur District of Gujarat.

In 1972 a breed census found a total population of 295 000, of which more than 200 000 were breeding females. The population reported to DAD-IS for 2013 was 1.82–3.08 million.

== Description ==
Body size: Sirohi goats are medium to large sized animals with compact cylindrical to conical body. Generally, cylindrical shaped animals are believed to be better meat producers while animals with conical body are considered good in milk production. Some adult animals may have a depression in the thoracic region, giving a saddle back appearance. The body is covered with fairly dense hair which is short and coarse. Coat colour: Prominent colours are brown and brown with light to dark brown patches (spotted brown). Both, brown and spotted brown types are generally available in three shades of dark, medium and light. Very few animals are completely white. The body coat is generally shiny in nature, but some animals possess hairy coat also. Face: Face of Sirohi goat is generally straight or sometimes slightly raised. Ear: Ears are generally flat and leaf like, medium-sized and drooping type. They are described as pendulous, drooping downwards, leaf-like in shape with slight curvature towards back. Horn: Both males and females have horns which are generally curved upward and backward with pointed tips; but other horn patterns are also seen. Some Sirohi animals without horn (polled) are also found. Tail: Tail is small to medium in length and curved upward. Wattles and beard: Some Sirohi animals have two wattles hanging from the neck and beard under the lower jaw. Indo-Swiss Goat Project (ISGP) study reported that wattles were present in about 30% of animals. True beard are also present in few animals. Udder conformation: Udder is small and round, with small teats placed laterally. Some (6%) of the goats registered under the Indo-Swiss Goat Project (ISGP scheme were reported to have supernumerary teats.

== As livestock ==
Sirohi/Ajmera goats are dual-purpose animals, being reared for both milk and meat. The animals are popular for their weight gain and lactation even under poor quality rearing conditions. The animals are resistant to major diseases and are easily adaptable to different climatic conditions specially in hot places . Though the main breeding tracts of Sirohi/Ajmera goats are situated in the Aravalli hills of Rajasthan, they are also widely distributed in several other Indian states. On average, 90% of all births will result in a single kid with the remaining 10% producing twins. Lactation can last for up to 90 days and average to 0.75–1 kg/day for a good does.
