= Damascus goat =

Middle-Eastern breed of goat

Damascus
- Conservation status: FAO (2007): not at risk; DAD-IS (2026): not at risk
- Other names: Aleppo; Baladi; Chami; Damascene; Halep; Shami
- Country of origin: Greater Syria
- Distribution: Azerbaijan; Bolivia; Cyprus; Egypt; Greece; Iraq; Jordan; Lebanon; Libya; Malawi; Oman; Palestine; Qatar; Syria; Turkey
- Use: milk and meat

Traits
- Weight: Male: 57 kg; Female: 40 kg
- Height: Male: 80 cm; Female: 72 cm
- Goat; Capra aegagrus hircus

The Damascus or Damascene is a Middle Eastern breed of dairy goat, named after the city of Damascus in Syria. It is variously also known as the Aleppo or Halep for the city of Aleppo; as the Shami or Chami, for the historical region of Ash-Sham or Greater Syria; or as the Baladi ('local'). It is widely found in countries of the Near and Middle East, including Azerbaijan, Cyprus, Egypt, Greece, Iraq, Jordan, Lebanon, Libya, Oman, Palestine, Qatar, Syria and Turkey; it is also present in Bolivia and Malawi.

== History ==
In 2026 the total number of the goats world-wide was estimated to be 302775, Populations of over 10000 head were reported by Cyprus, Iraq, Oman, Palestine and Turkey. No data has been reported by Syria since 2006, when the estimate was 61447 head. The world-wide conservation status is 'not at risk'.

Stock was introduced to Cyprus in the first half to the twentieth century and for more than half a century has been selectively bred for performance in both milk and meat production; in 2018 the total number of the goats on the island was estimated at 100000–165000, the highest number reported by any country.

In Turkey the Damascus has been cross-bred with the Anatolian Black to form the Kilis. Experimental cross-breeds of the Aradi of Saudi Arabia with the Damascus showed an improvement in rate of growth compared to the Saudi stock.

== Characteristics ==
The Damascus is of similar type to the Anglo-Nubian, with a convex profile and long pendulous ears, but is considerable smaller. The average body weight is about 40 kg for nannies and 57 kg for billies; average heights at the withers are approximately 72 cm and 80 cm respectively. In Cyprus average body weights are higher: 67 kg for nannies – with an average height of 77 cm – and 85 kg for billies.

The coat is long and is most often either dark brown or red; pied patterns, grey and tri-coloured – dark brown, red and white – are also seen. The goats may be with or without tassels, and may be either horned or polled.

== Use ==
It is a dual-purpose breed, reared both for milk and for meat. In Syria the average milk yield per lactation is approximately 375 kg, with a butter-fat content of 4.76%; milk yields in southern Turkey are higher, at some 500 to 600 kg. Prolificity is high: litter size averages approximately 2.5.

A goat of this breed ranked first place at the Mazayen al-Maaz goat beauty contest in Riyadh in 2008.
