= Chengde Down =

Chinese breed of goat

- Conservation status: FAO (2007): no data; DAD-IS (2020): no data
- Other names: Chengde Horn Down; Yanshan Polled
- Country of origin: China
- Distribution: Hebei Province
- Use: cashmere

Traits
- Weight: Male: average 54.5 kg; Female: average 41.5 kg
- Wool colour: usually black
- Horn status: horned or polled
- Beard: yes
- Tassels: may be tasselled
- Goat; Capra aegagrus hircus

The Chengde Down is a Chinese breed of cashmere goat. It originates in Hebei Province in northern China, on the border with Liaoning and Inner Mongolia. If hornless it may also be known as the Yanshan Polled.

== Characteristics ==
The Chengde Down is a well-muscled goat of medium size. It has small erect ears, is usually bearded and may have tassels. It is usually horned in both sexes, but may also be hornless or polled; if polled, it may also be known as the Yanshan Polled, and may be brown in colour. The coat is of medium length and is usually black; it may also be black-and-white or white. The cashmere yield is approximately 245 g per year; the fibre has a diameter of 14–16 micron.
