= Bilberry goat =

Breed of goat

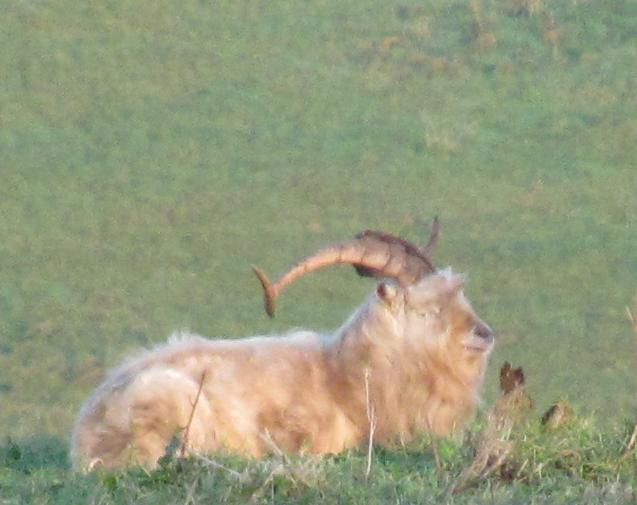
Bilberry goat at rest in the winter morning sun.

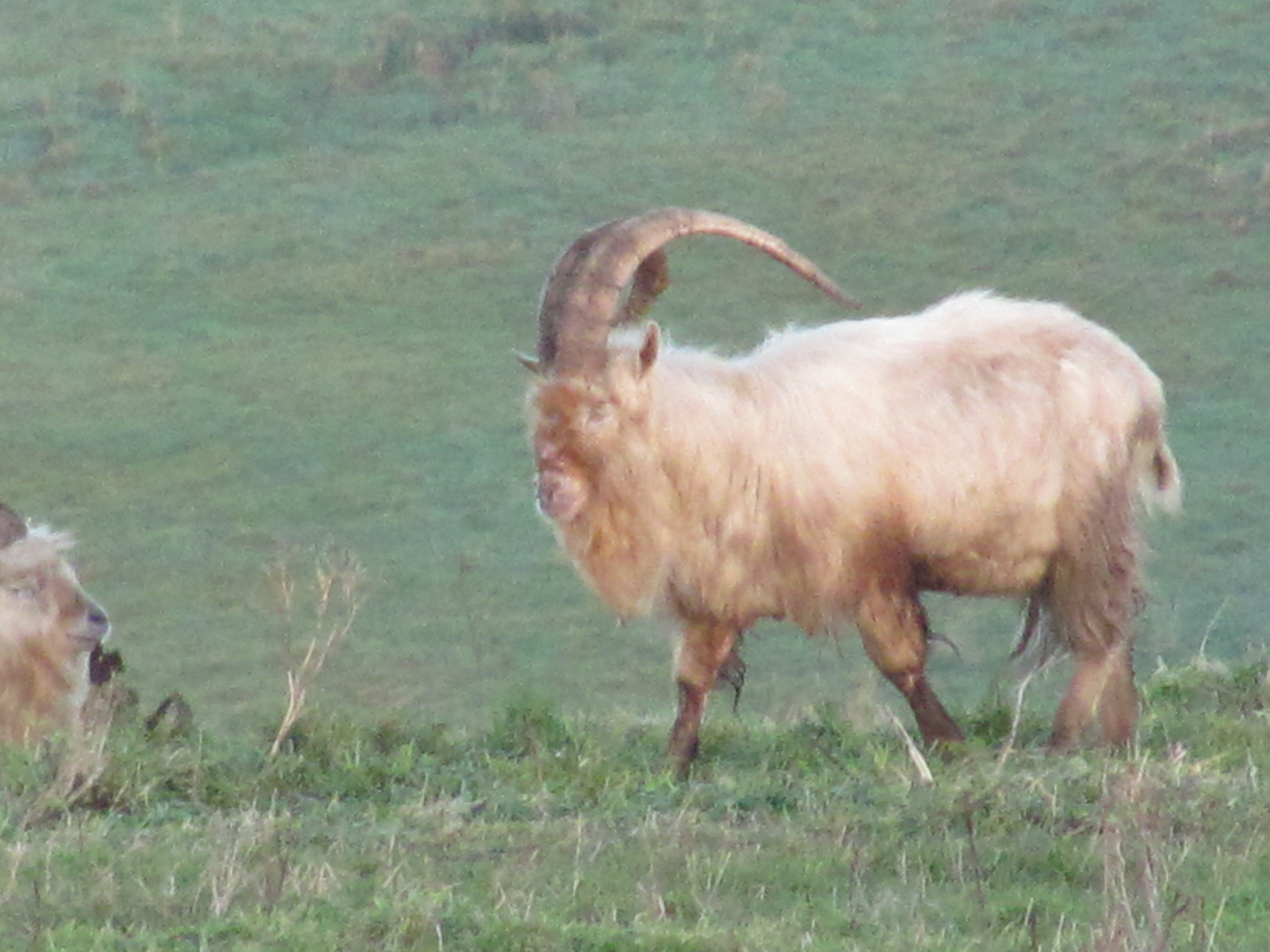
A Bilberry goat forages around in the morning

The Bilberry goat (Irish: Fiaghabhar na bhFraochán) is a breed of feral goat (Capra aegagrus hircus) which is believed to have lived in one herd on Bilberry Rock in Waterford City in the south of Ireland for hundreds of years.

Unlike any other breed found in Ireland, the Bilberry herd is thought to be related to Pashmina, Maltese or Cashmere goats. Locals believe they came over with the Huguenots from France over 300 years ago and have lived on Bilberry Rock ever since.

The goats are feared close to extinction; numbering only 7 in the year 2000 and 21 in 2005. A group of volunteers formed the Bilberry Goat Heritage Trust in 2000 to protect and support the herd. The population has continued to recover and reached 42 in 2008. The herd is led by a dominant nanny. Bilberry goats are large, with shaggy coats and very large horns. Two members of the British Feral Goat Society, Dr.Shirley Goodyer and Dr. Ray Werner, together with Robert-Jan Prins, a breeder of Dutch Landrace goats, reported that they were "amazed to see a primitive herd still living in the wild", and that the goats are a "unique ancient breed."

== Conservation ==
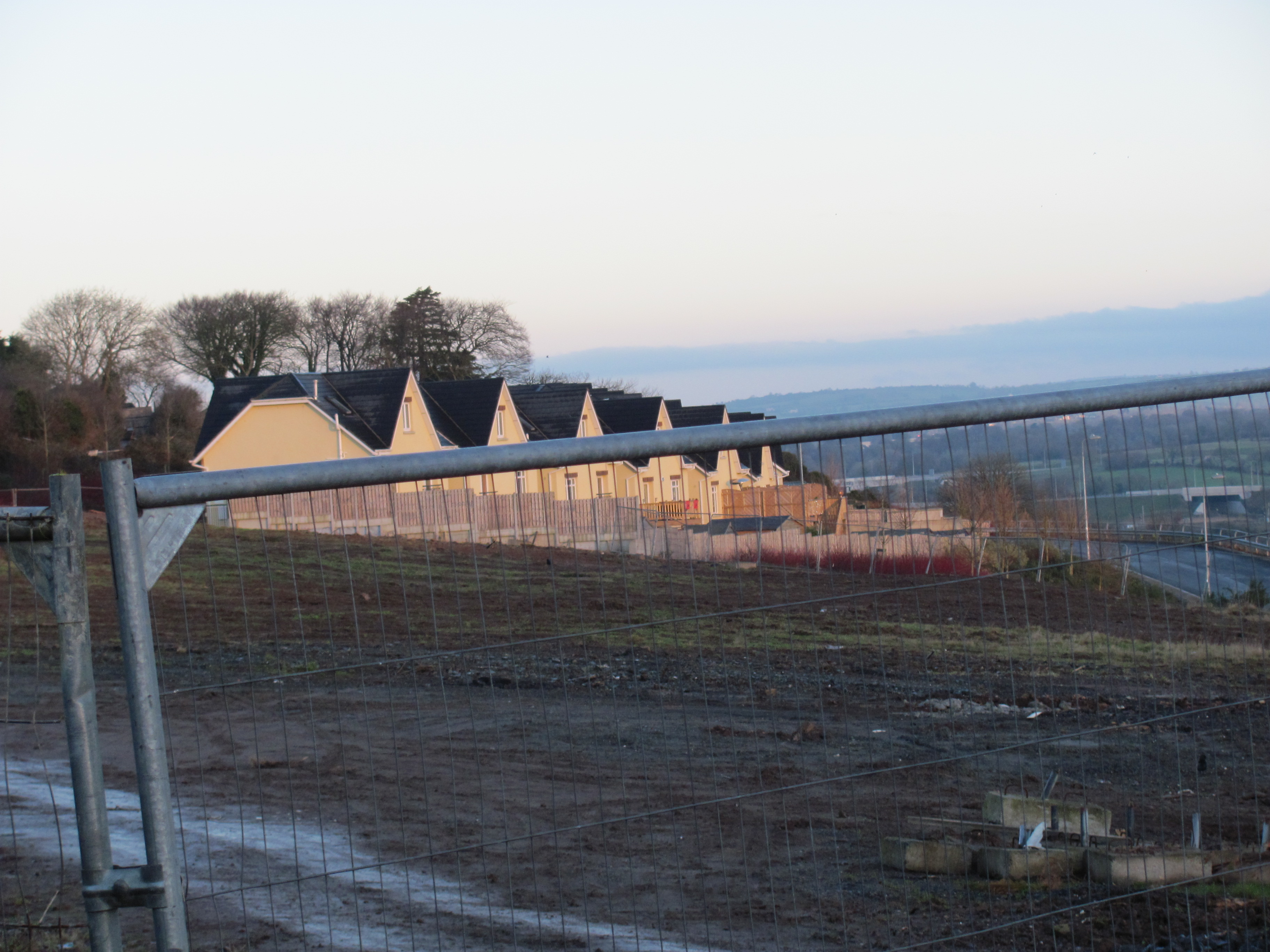
Example of 2009 housing development just beyond the habitat of the goats

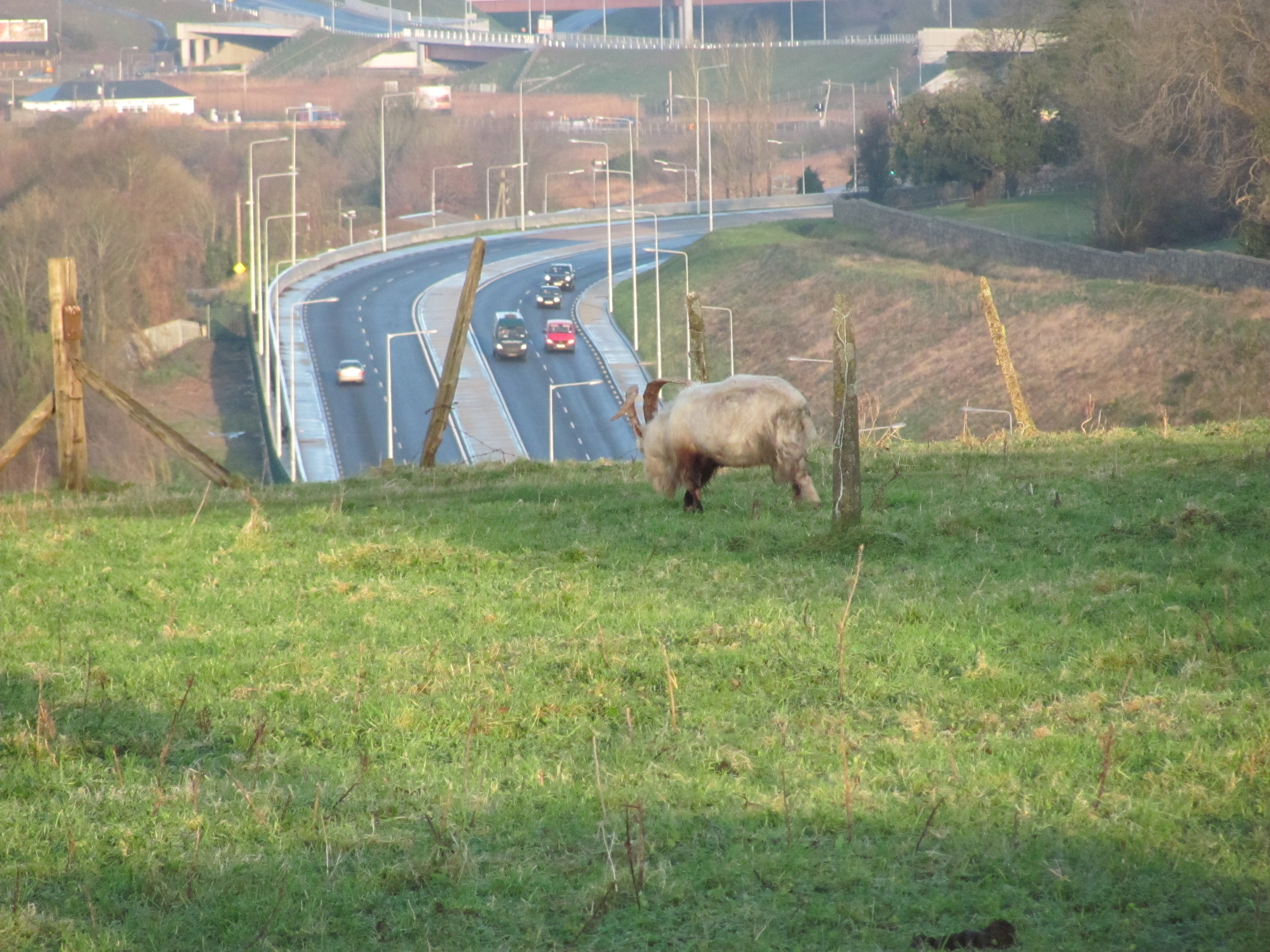
The goats overlook the main roads and the river Suir

The Bilberry Goat Trust was set up to protect these goats from extinction. The 14-acre (5.7 ha) piece of land where they graze used to be a commonage but was sold to a developer who wanted to build houses in the whole area. This would render the Bilberry Herd extinct and appeals were made sparking publicity. Zoning authorities decided to reduce the goats' area to 12.5 acres (5.1 ha). The Irish Wildlife Trust is actively involved in the campaign. The feral goat is not a protected species and Bilberry Rock is not a Natural Heritage Area under the Wildlife Act 2000.
