= Jamnapari =

Breed of goat

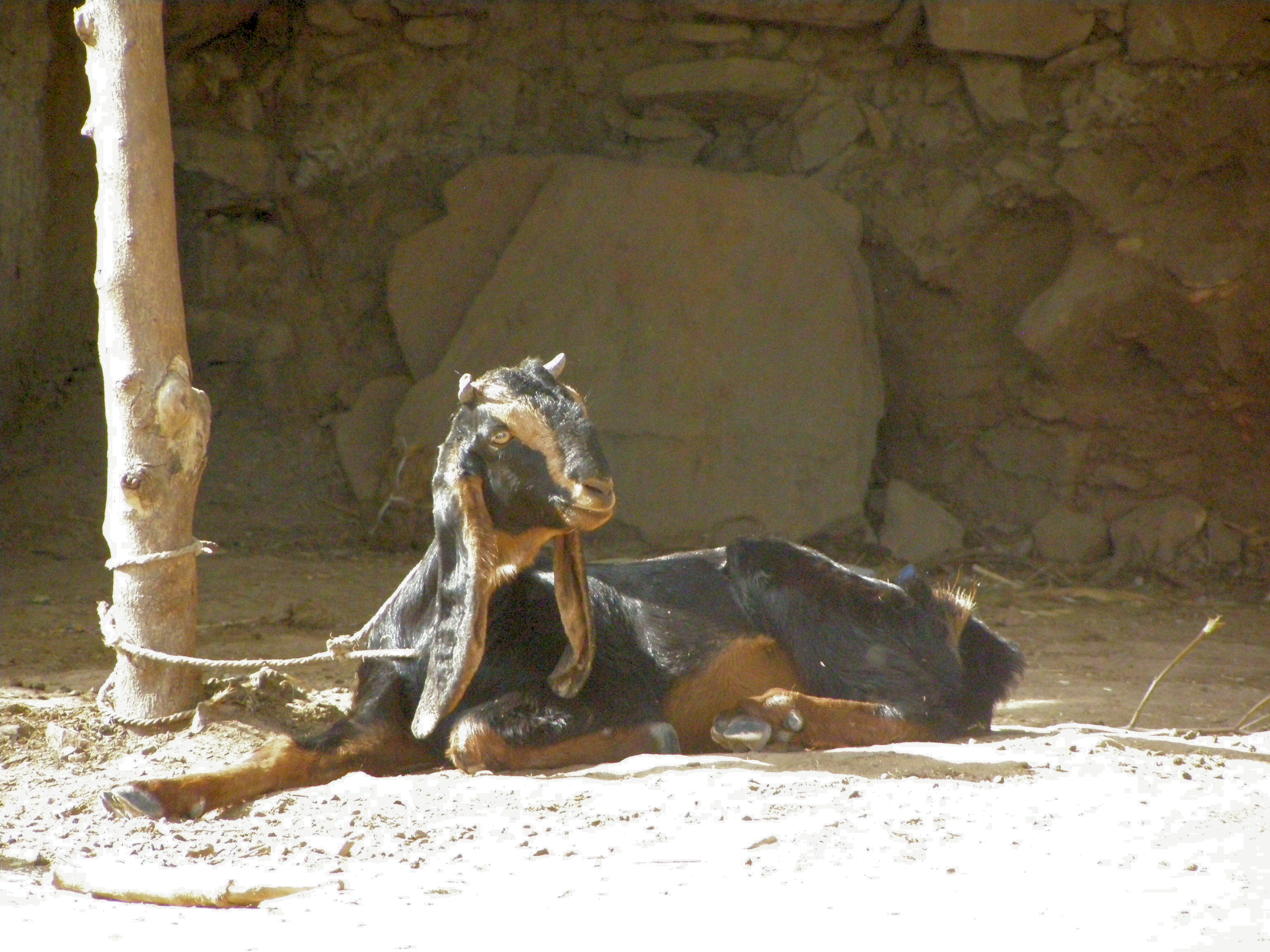
- Conservation status: FAO (2007): not at risk; DAD-IS (2021): not at risk
- Other names: Jamunapari; Etawah; Chambal Queen; Chakarnagar Pari; Ram Chagol
- Country of origin: India
- Distribution: Uttar Pradesh; Madhya Pradesh; Indonesia; Bangladesh
- Use: milk

Traits
- Weight: Male: average 45 kg; Female: average 38 kg
- Height: Male: average 78 cm; Female: average 75 cm
- Goat; Capra aegagrus hircus

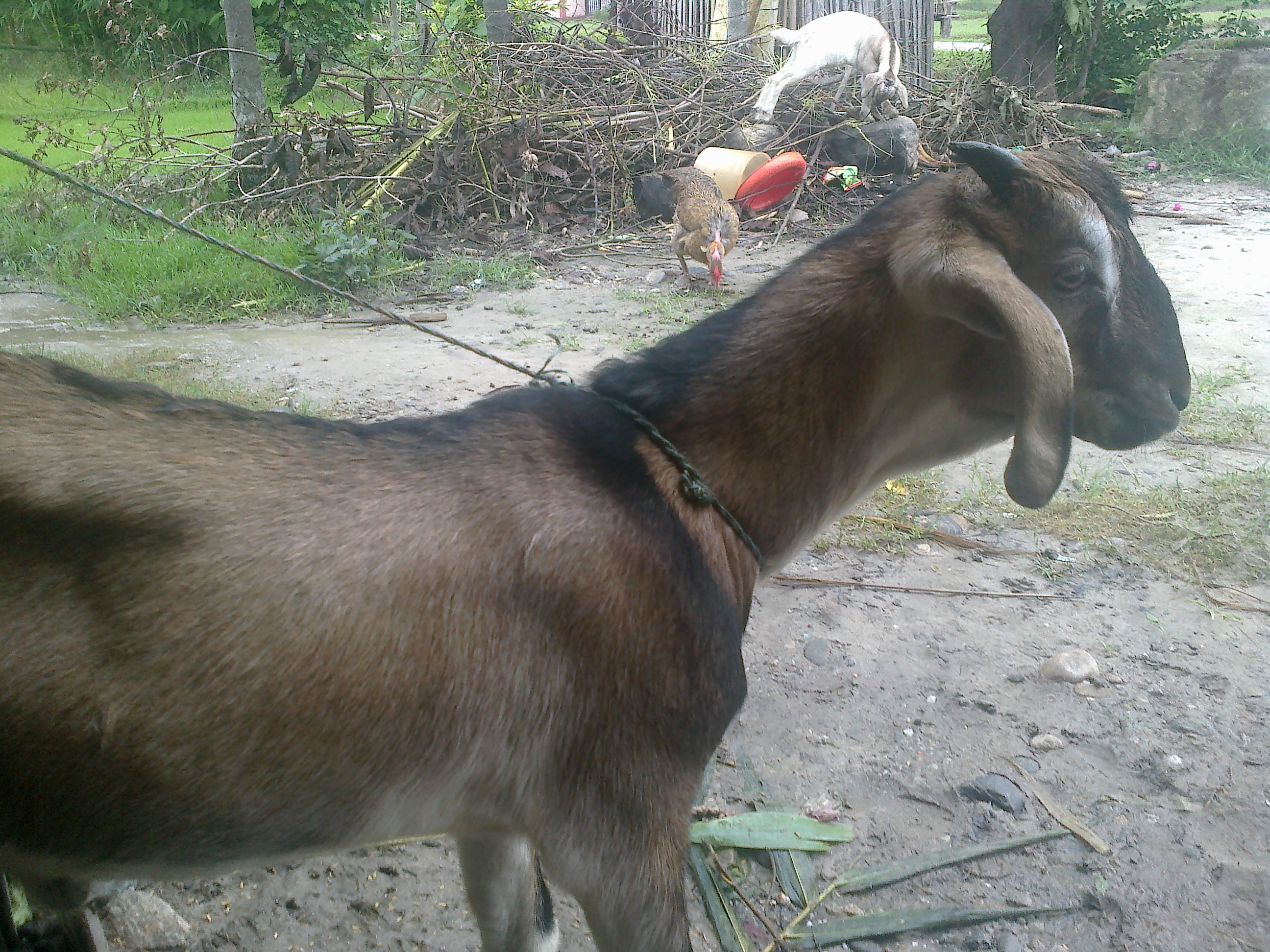
Jamnapari goat in Nepal

Jamnapari, Jamunapari or Jumnapari is an Indian breed of domestic goat originating in the Braj region of Uttar Pradesh. It has been exported to Indonesia, where it is known as the Etawah. It is bred for both milk and meat. The name is derived from the Yamuna river.

== History ==
The Jamnapari originated in the Etawah District of Uttar Pradesh, and is particularly associated with the tehsil of Chakarnagar. It is one of the ancestors of the Anglo-Nubian.

In India there were an estimated 580,000 of the breed in the 1972 census, although less than 5000 were thought to be purebred.

== Characteristics ==
There is a large variation in color but the typical Jamnapari is white with patches of tan on the neck and head. Their heads tend to have a highly convex nose, which gives them a parrot-like appearance. They have long flat drooping ears which are around 25 cm (10 in) long. Both sexes have horns. The udder has round, conical teats and is well developed. They also have unusually long legs.

The Jamnapari male can weigh up to 40 kg (88 lb), while females can reach around 30 kg (66 lb) depending upon climates and environmental condition.

The average lactation yield per day has been found to be slightly less than two kilograms. Jamnapari meat is said to be low in cholesterol.

During the winter they spend more than 90% of their time grazing, although this falls to around 55% in the hot Indian summer. The breed browses on bushes, tree leaves and the top of grasses rather than typical ground grazing. Their mean heart rate was found to be 127 ± 3.46 in one study.

Rates of conception are high, nearly 90%. Triplets and quadruplets are common. The average age of first conception is 18 months.

== See also ==
- Black Bengal goat
