= Barbari goat =

Indian breed of goat

Barbari
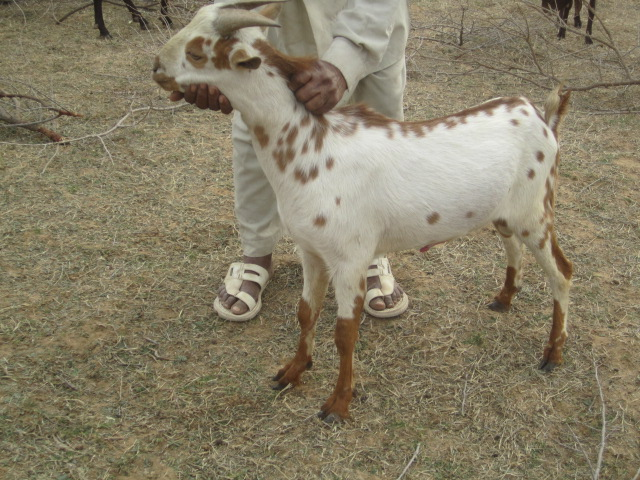
- Conservation status: FAO (2007): not at risk
- Other names: Bari; Sai Bari; Thori Bari; Titri Bari; Wadi Bari
- Distribution: Haryana, India; Punjab, India; Uttar Pradesh, India; Punjab, Pakistan; Sindh, Pakistan
- Use: dual-purpose, meat and milk

Traits
- Weight: Male: 38 kg; Female: 23 kg
- Height: Male: 71 cm; Female: 56 cm
- Goat; Capra aegagrus hircus

The Barbari or Bari is a breed of small domestic goat found across a wide area in India and Pakistan. It is distributed in the states of Haryana, Punjab and Uttar Pradesh in India, and in Punjab and Sindh provinces of Pakistan.

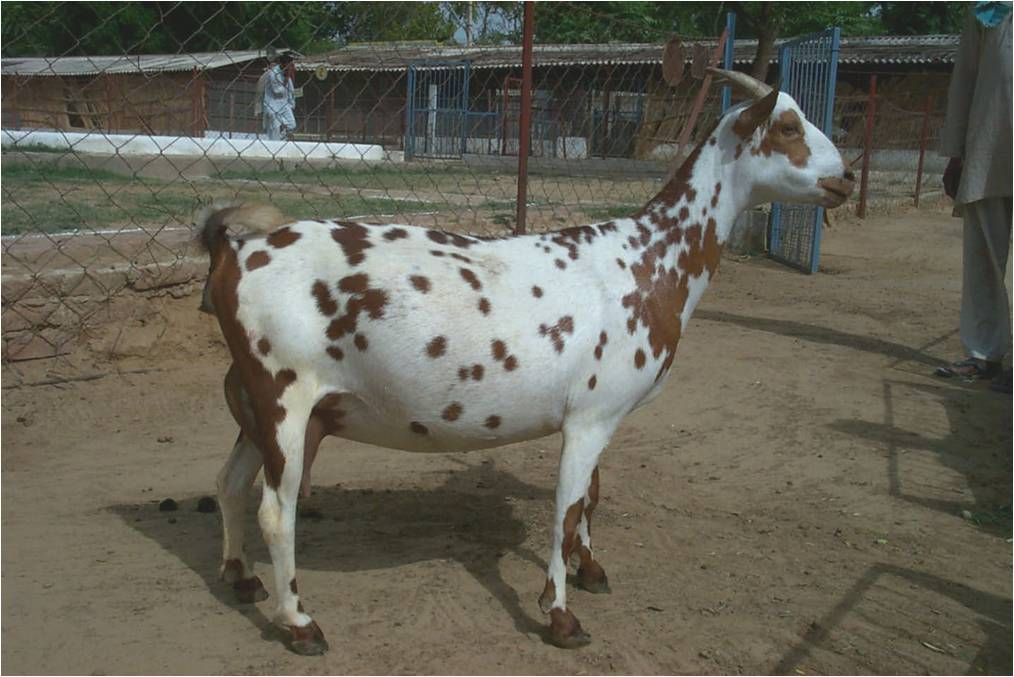

== History ==
The Barbari is thought to have originated in the Indian subcontinent; a suggestion that it came from, and is named for, the Somali port city of Berbera is disputed. It is one of twenty classified breeds in India and is found mainly in arid and semi-arid areas of the north-west of the country. It is distributed in the states of Haryana, Punjab and Uttar Pradesh in India, and in Punjab and Sindh provinces of Pakistan. It is also reported from Mauritius, Nepal and Vietnam. In 2024 the world population was estimated at about 3.4 million, based on data reported by India alone. Population data for Pakistan dates from 2006, when the total was estimated at about 2.3 million.

== Characteristics ==
The Barbari is a small goat of compact form. The head is small and neat, with small upward-pointing ears and small horns. The coat is short and is most commonly white, spotted with brownish red; solid colours also occur. There is a polled strain, the Thori Bari.

== Use ==
The Barbari is a dual-purpose breed, reared both for meat and for milk, and is well adapted for arid and semi-arid Indian and Pakistani conditions. It is a seasonal breeder and is used for intensive farming. The milk yield is approximately 107 litres in a lactation of about 150 days.
