= Belgian Fawn goat =

Breed of goat

The Belgian Fawn goat breed, created in Belgium, is descended from the Chamois Colored goat of Switzerland. As such, it is related to and similar to the Oberhasli goat bred in the United States.

== Sources ==
Belgian Fawn
