= Swedish Landrace goat =

Breed of goat

The Swedish Landrace (Svensk Lantras) goat breed from northern Sweden is used for the production of milk, which is used to make types of goat cheese.

== See also ==
- Landrace
- Danish Landrace goat
- Dutch Landrace goat
- Finnish Landrace goat

== Sources ==
- Swedish Landrace Goat
