= Repartida =

Breed of goat

The Repartida goat breed from northeastern Brazil is a color type selectively bred from the Chué goat. Like its progenitor, it is a meat-type breed.

== Sources ==
- Repartida Goat
