= Maraz goat =

Breed of goat

Merez goat (Kurdish: Bizinê Merez) or Markhoz goat (Traditional Kurdish fabric) is a breed of goat indigenous to Kurdistan that are known as a multipurpose livestock and especially famous for their high quality fiber.

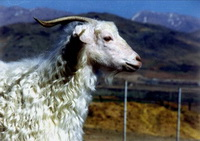
White Merez goat in mountains

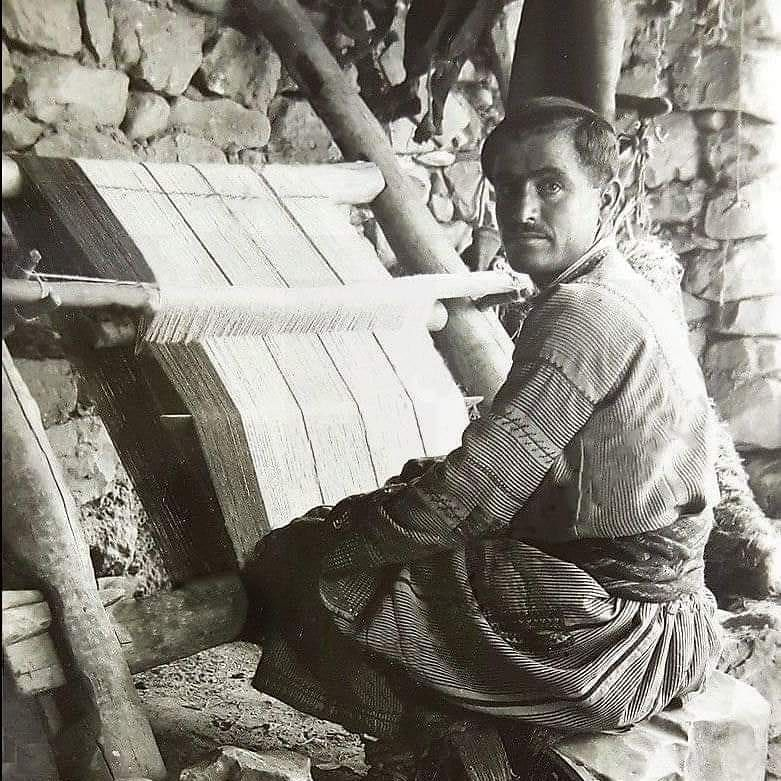
Special weaving machine and woven fabrics from Merez fibers for sewing Kurdish men's clothing

== History ==
The history of goat domestication in Mesopotamia dates back to 9000 BC. Maraz goat has been long used as for its milk, meat and most importantly high quality fiber known as mohair. The goat has been for long known and domesticated in Mesopotamia and has the furthest genetic distance to other breeds of goats.

== Appearances ==
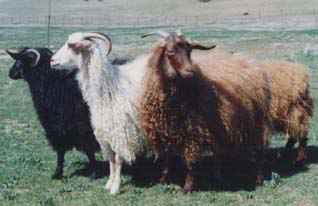
Different colors of maraz goat: black, white and a shade of brown.

Maraz goats are agile and have small bodies (weigh between 30 and 35 kilograms on average). They have different colors such as white, black and different shades of brown and grey.

== Fiber ==
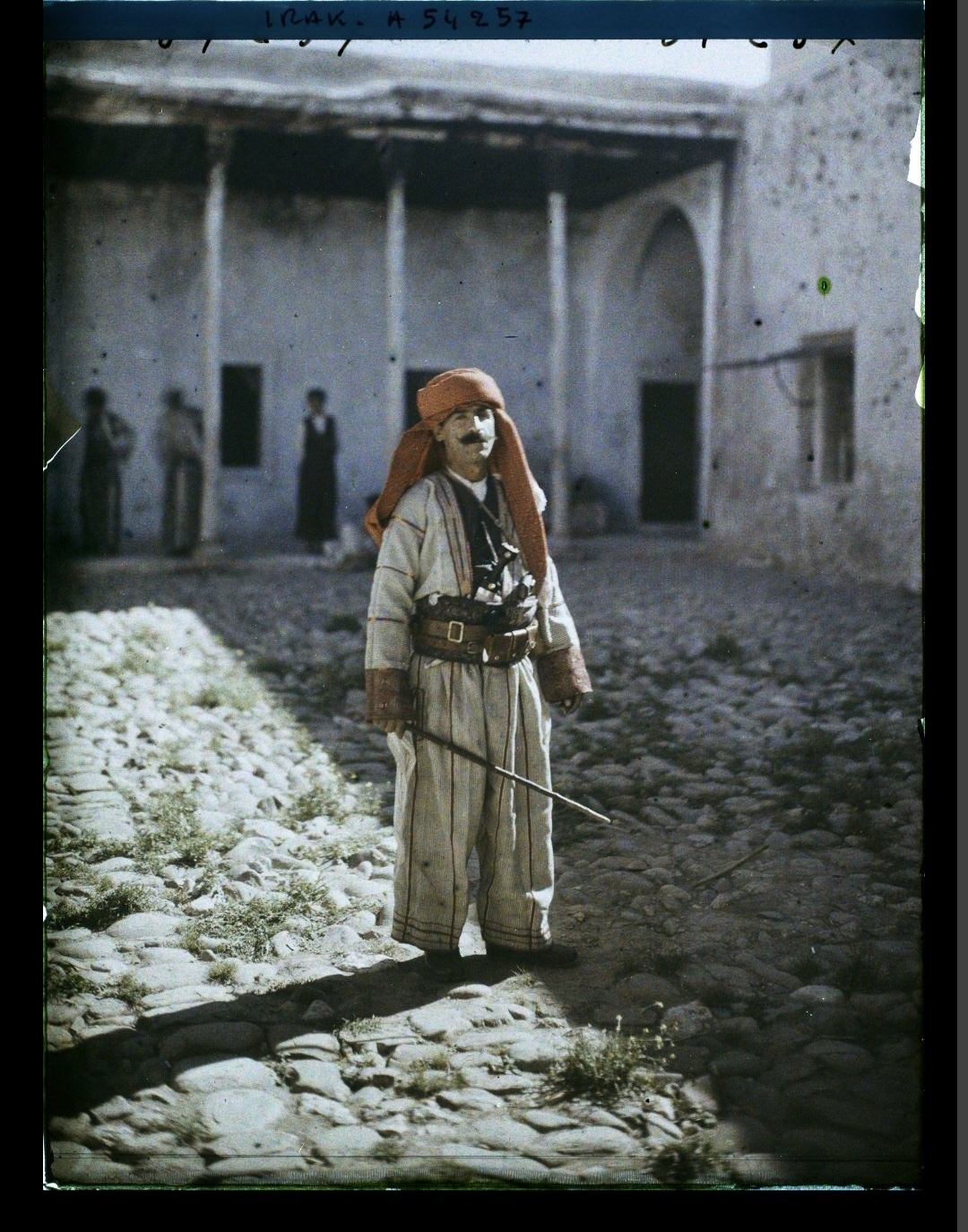
Kurdish men wearing Şal û Şepik made of Merez goat's fiber - Zaxo

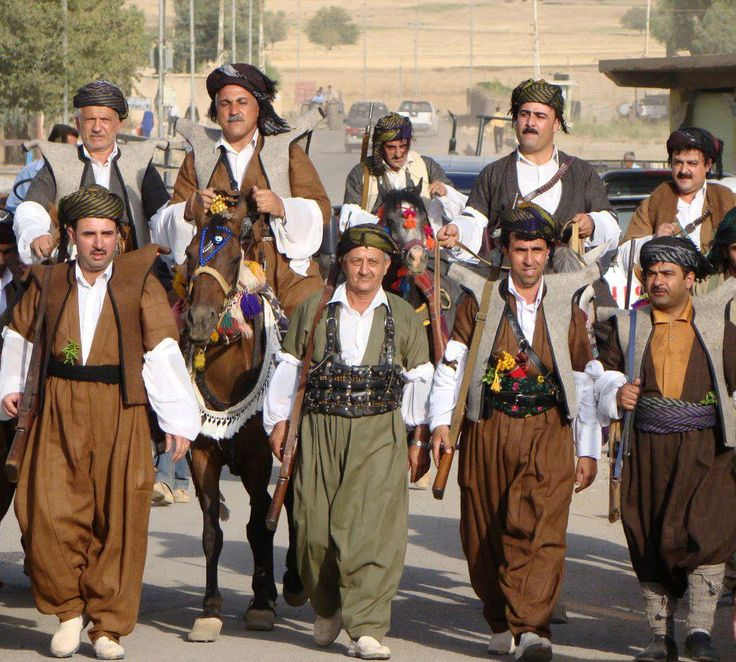
Kurdish men wearing Rank u choxe that is made of maraz goat's fiber

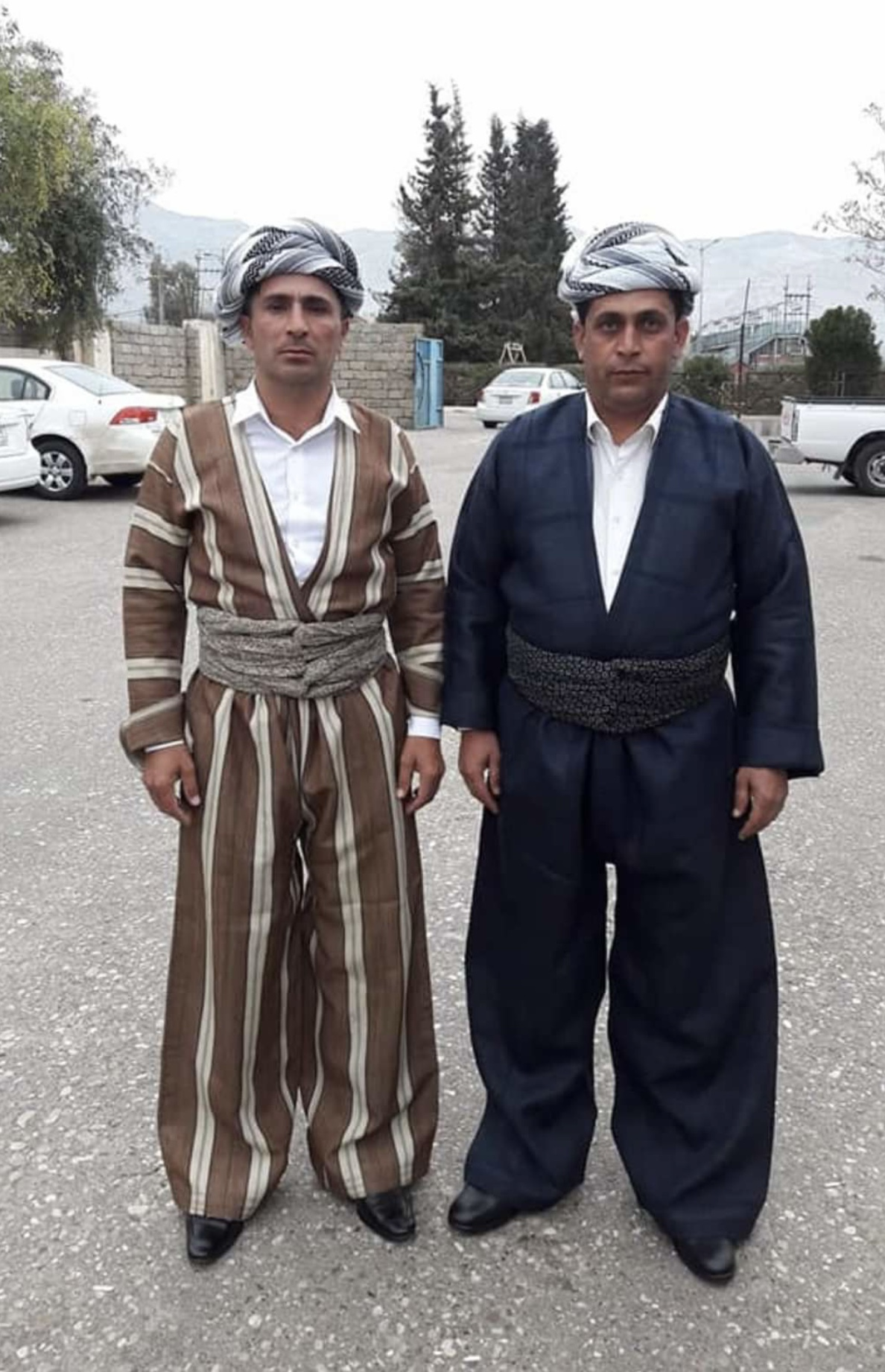
Kurdish mens wearing Şal û Şepik - Merez goat's fiber - Duhok

The body of maraz goat is covered with wool-like curly mohair that is often used for weaving fabrics used in Kurdish clothing. The fiber is especially used in men's clothing for making Şal û Şepik and Rank û Çoxe, which consists of a coat and pants worn by men.
