= Kamori =

Pakistani goat breed

Kamori is a popular goat breed found in the Sindh province of Pakistan. They have a distinctive body structure with long ears and neck and a large body, and a distinctive color. The purebred Kamori goat has dark brown shiny skin with small coffee-colored or dark patches over its entire body. Pure Kamoris are rare and expensive. They have been crossed with the Gulabi breed to produce the Pateri breed, another breed found in Sindh; hybrids have the Kamori's body structure, but are less expensive. Additionally, genetic analysis confirmed that the appearance of the Kamori and Pateri (also spelt Patairee) goat species is very similar in that both species have long ears and brown coats, although Pateri (Patairee) goat species sometimes appear to have brown front quarters and white hindquarters.

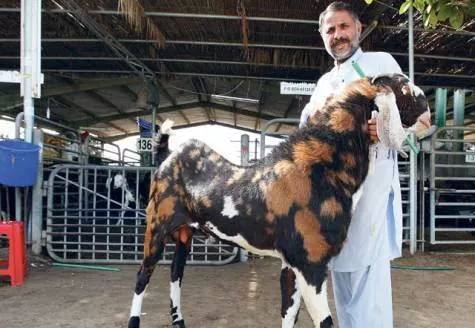
Kamori

The Kamori breed is chiefly found in the districts of Dadu, Larkana, and Nawabshah. It is primarily used for the production of milk.
