= Russian White Dairy =

Russian breed of dairy goat

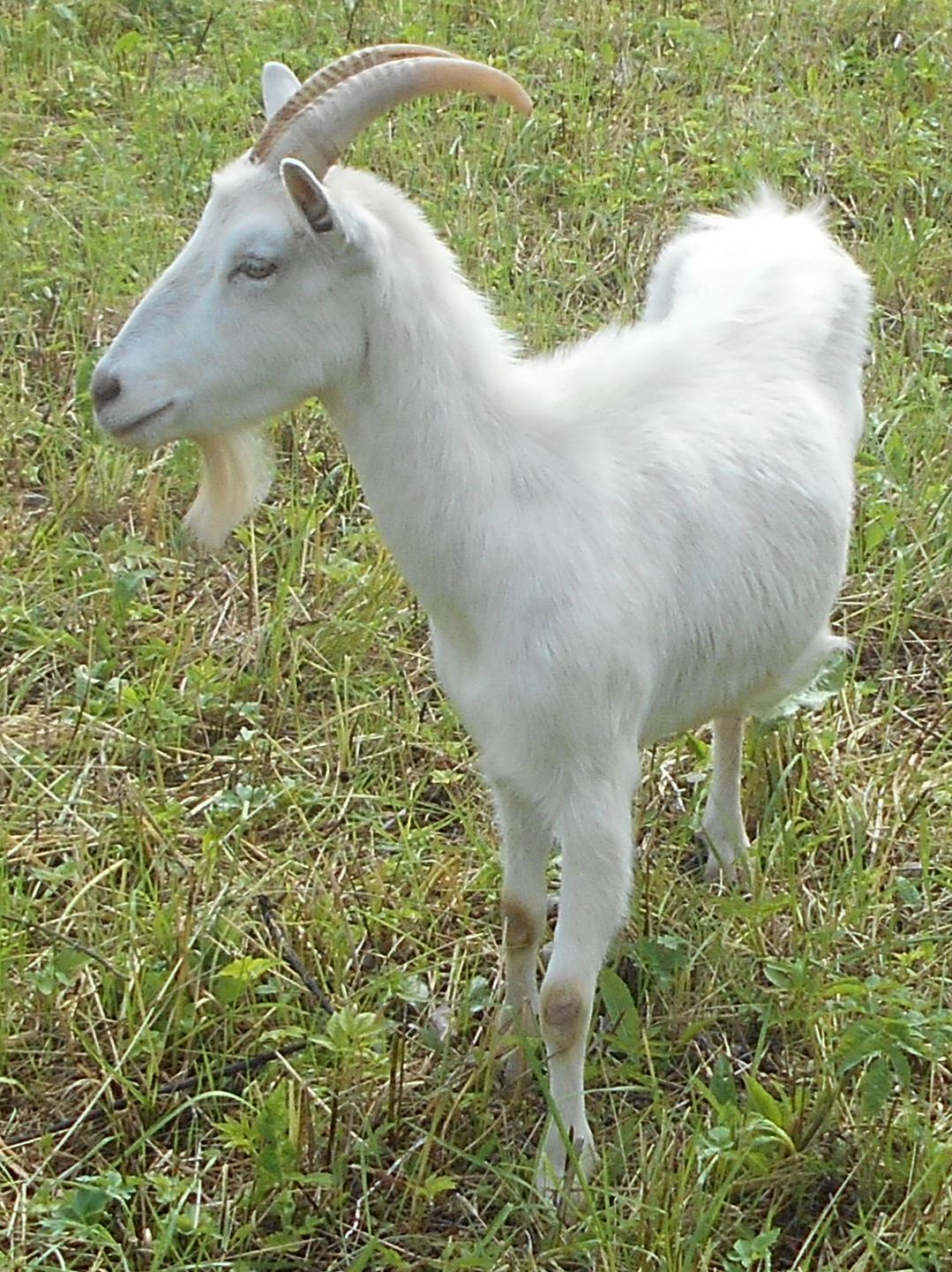
- Conservation status: FAO (2007): not at risk; DAD-IS (2021): unknown
- Other names: Russkaya Belaya; Russian Dairy; Improved North Russian
- Country of origin: Soviet Union; Russian Federation
- Use: dairy

Traits
- Weight: Male: 60–75 kg; Female: 50–60 kg
- Horn status: horned or polled
- Goat; Capra aegagrus hircus

The Russian White Dairy or Russian White is a Russian breed of dairy goat. It derives from cross-breeding of the indigenous North Russian with imported Swiss Saanen goats; this began in about 1905. The Gorki derives from it, but is always horned, while the Russian White may be horned or polled. It has become a rare breed, numbering only a few thousand head.
