= Hejazi goat =

Breed of goat

The Hejazi goat breed originatates from the Hejaz region in saudi Arabia, it is most commonly used for the production of meat.

== Physical Characteristics ==
The Hejazi goat is usually black and long-haired, with short backward-curving horns. It is well known for long ears.

== Sources ==
- Hejazi Goat
