= Chigu goat =

Breed of goat

The Chigu goat breed, found north of Uttar Pradesh and northeast of Himachal Pradesh in India, is used for the production of meat and cashmere wool. The coat is usually white, mixed with grayish red. Both sexes have long twisted horns. Males body weight is approximately 40 kg, while females body weight is approximately 25 kg. Conformation is similar to Chanthangi. Live in mountainous ranges with the altitude varying from 3500 to 5000 m. This area is mostly cold and arid.

== See also ==
- Cashmere goat

== Sources ==
- "Chigu Goat". Archived from the original on 22 December 2008.
- Goats by breed - Chigu
