= Chengdu Brown =

Breed of goat

The Chengdu Brown goat breed from the Sichuan Province of China, is used for the production of meat and milk.

== Sources ==
"Chengdu Brown". Archived from the original on 23 December 2008.
