= Corsican goat =

Breed of goat

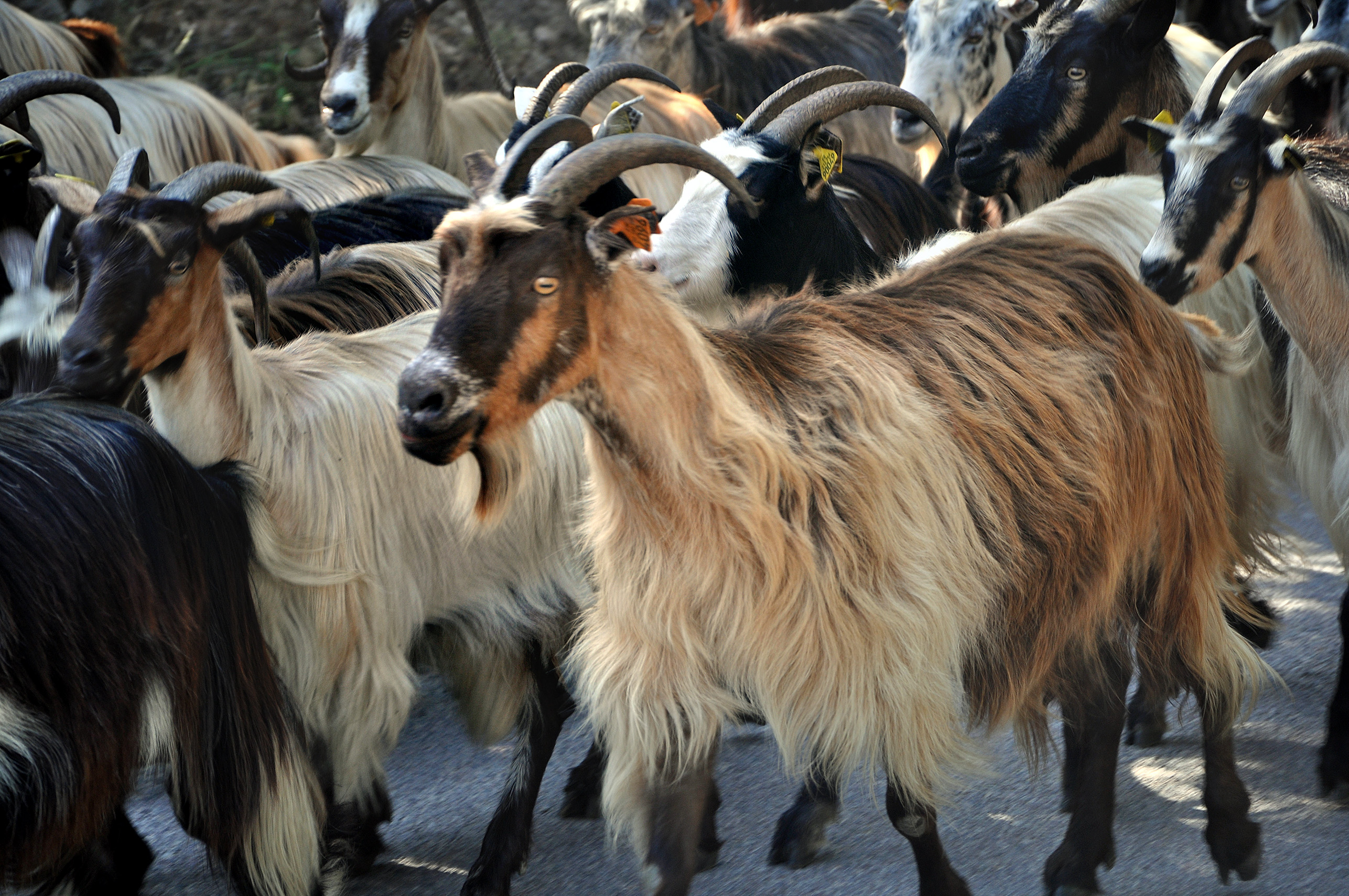
- Goats in Corsica

The Corsican goat (also known as Corse) breed from the French island of Corsica is used primarily for the production of milk.

== Origins ==
The origin of the indigenous goats in Corsica is uncertain, but their existence has been around for thousands of years. French alpines were used for upgrading in the 1970s. The result is small to medium-sized Corsican goats perfectly adapted to the island's life. These goats are traditionally herded from mountain pasture to pasture during summer and back to warmer lowlands in fall.

Almost 98% of the region's goat population is Corsican.

== Appearance ==
The average size of a female Corsican goat weighs 30 to 40kg, while a male Corsican goat weighs between 45 and 60kg. The Corsican goat has parallel, curved horns, long hair, a narrow head, and small ears. Its hair is of various colors: black, red, fawn, variegated white, and mottled.

== Characteristics and abilities ==
The Corsican goat is a dairy animal characterized by its hardiness, adaptability to the climate and island environment, and ability to thrive in the brush. Its long hair protects from thorns, while robust limbs and powerful hooves enable these goats to move quickly on difficult terrain. The Corsican goat does not give a lot of milk, with a short lactation period. The average milk production per lactation period is 181 liters in 205 days of milking. However, their milk is high in butterfat and milk solids, making it perfect for making farmhouse cheeses.
