= Mogħża Maltija =

Maltese breed of goat

- Flock during the Siege of Malta, 1942
- Conservation status: International; FAO (2007): not at risk; DAD-IS (2026): not at risk; Malta; DAD-IS (2026): unknown
- Other names: Maltese
- Country of origin: Malta
- Distribution: Malta; Greece; Turkey
- Use: principally for milk

Traits
- Horn status: usually polled (hornless)
- Beard: variable
- Tassels: usually present
- Goat; Capra aegagrus hircus

The Mogħża Maltija or Maltese is the traditional breed of goat of Malta. It was formerly widespread in the Maltese Islands and is documented from the nineteenth century. Goat's milk was formerly delivered from house to house by a goatherd with a flock of goats, from which the desired quantity was milked outside each front door. Goat's milk was also used to make ġbejniet, the traditional small fresh or dried cheeses of the islands.

The colour and pattern of the coat are both highly variable; the ears are usually carried horizontally, but both erect and lop ear types are also seen.

Its conservation status in Malta is unknown; the last report of population was for the year 1994, when the total number was estimated at 4400 head, with 4000 breeding nannies and 400 active billies. Its status world-wide is 'not at risk', largely because of the number of goats of the 'Malta' breed of Turkey, for which the population is estimated at between 82500 and 179000 head.
