= Cabra Majorera =

Breed of goat

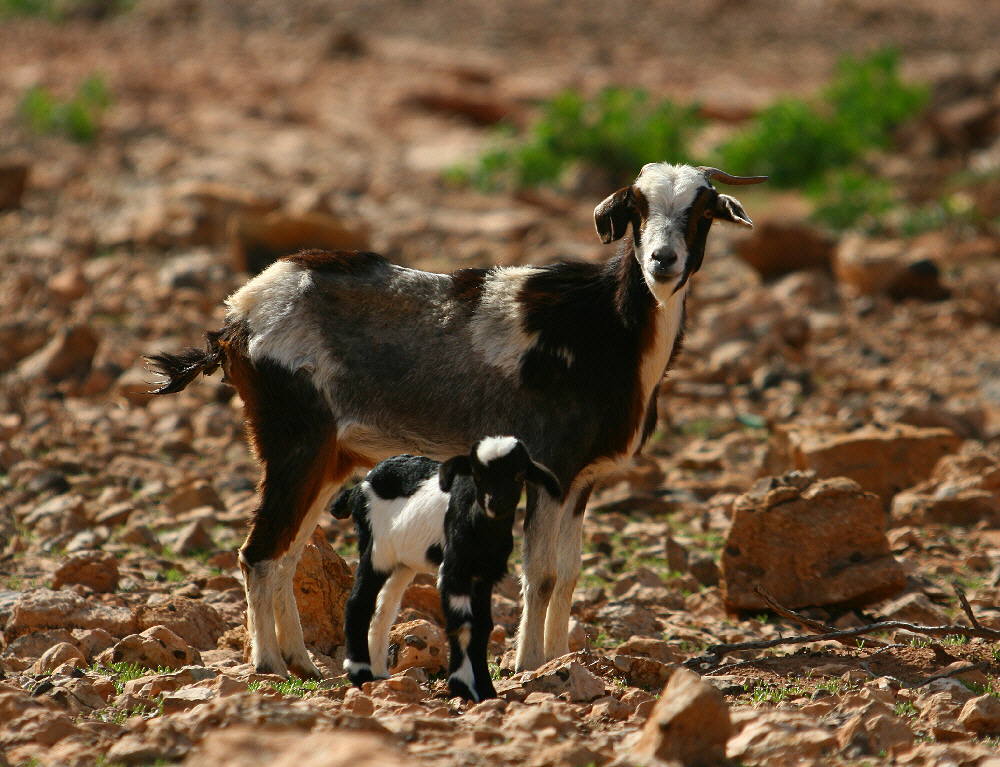
Cabra majorera

The Cabra Majorera is a Spanish breed of dairy goat native to the islands of Fuerteventura and Lanzarote in the Canary Islands. It is one of three goat breeds from the islands, the others being the Palmera of La Palma and the Tinerfeña of Tenerife; the Güera of North Africa also originates in the Canaries.

The Majorera is a particularly strong breed and has been exported to Africa and Latin America. Majorero cheese is made from its milk.
