= Spanish (goat breed) =

American breed of goat

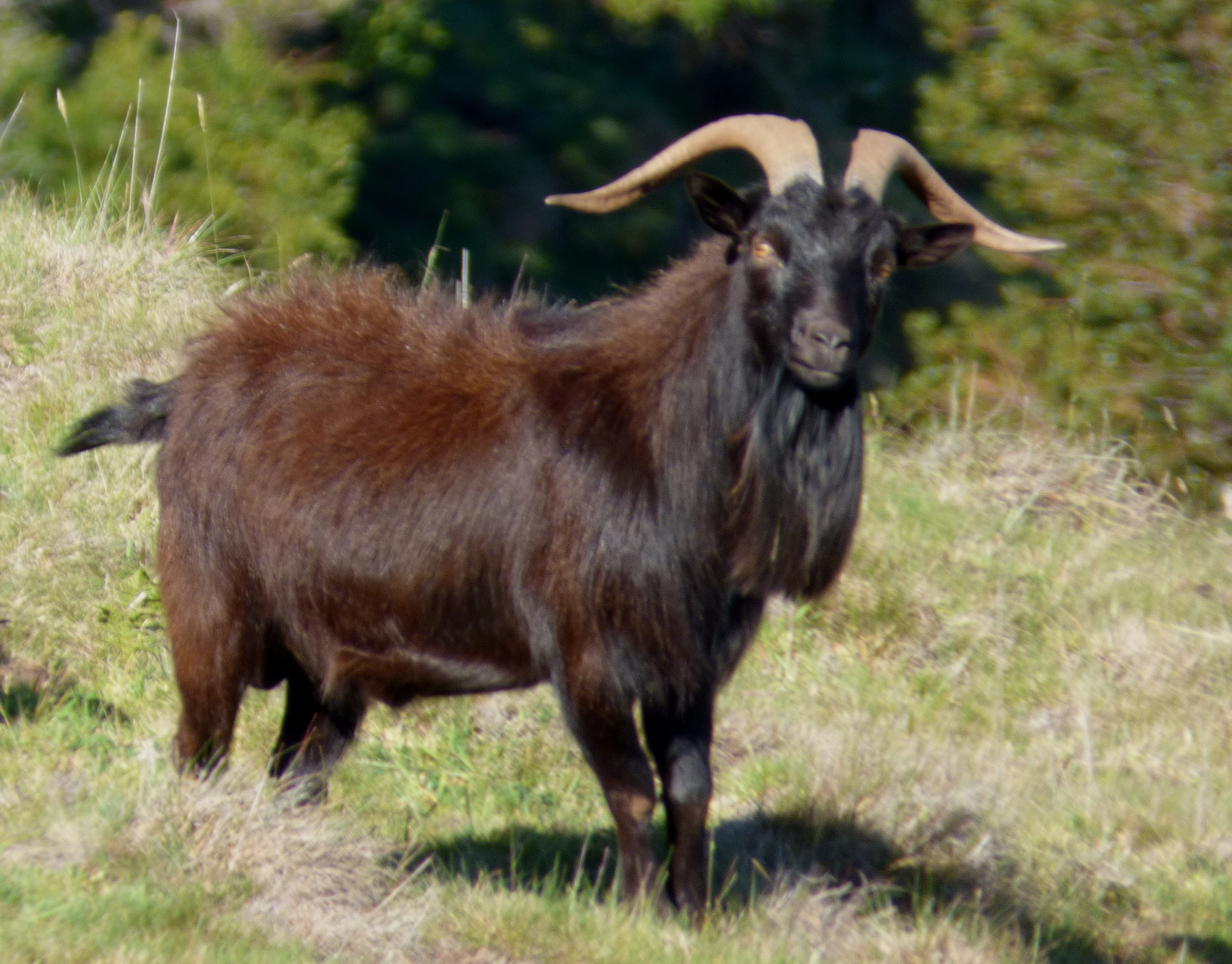

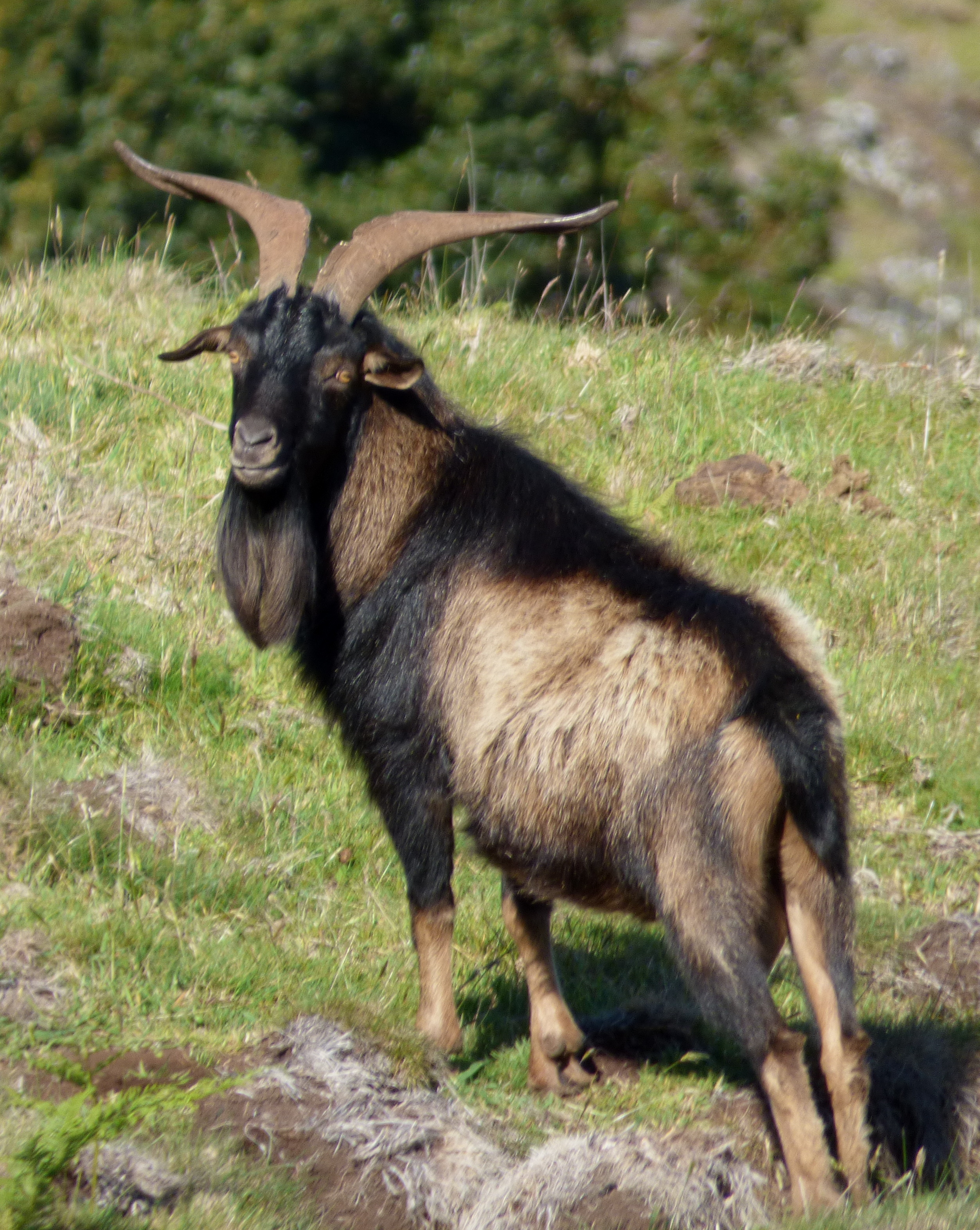
- Other names: brush goat; scrub goat; woods goat
- Country of origin: United States

Traits
- Goat; Capra aegagrus hircus

The Spanish goat is an American breed of domestic goat. It derives from European goats brought to the Americas in the sixteenth century by the conquistadores.

It is kept both for meat and for vegetation management, and is used mainly for clearing brush and other undesirable plant species from pasture land. Both it and cross-breeds deriving from it may also be known as 'brush', 'scrub' or 'woods' goats.

== History ==
European goats were brought to the Americas in the sixteenth century by the conquistadores and were soon introduced to the areas that later became parts of the United States and Mexico.

Both purebred stock of Spanish descent and cross-bred animals of indeterminate origin may at times be referred to as Spanish goats. The Spanish has been cross-bred with imported goat breeds both for cashmere and for meat production; most cross-bred goats show hybrid vigor, but cross-breeding may reduce the number of purebred stock. The conservation status of the breed is listed by the Livestock Conservancy as 'recovering', its lowest level of concern.

== Characteristics ==
The Spanish goat has the ability to breed out of season. It is hardy and able to survive and thrive under adverse conditions, making it well suited for rangeland management.

Black coats are common, but any color or pattern is accepted.
