= Uzbek Black goat =

Breed of goat

The Uzbek goat breed from Uzbekistan is used for the production of mohair.
