= Xinjiang goat =

Breed of goat

The Xinjiang goat breed from the mountains of Xinjiang in China is used for the production of milk, cashmere, and meat.

Annual cashmere yield is 137 g, with a cashmere length of 5.0 cm and a diameter of 12.74 μm. Cross-breeding with the Liaoning Cashmere breed has been found to improve cashmere yield and length at the cost of increased fibre diameter.

== See also ==
- Cashmere goat
