= Hungarian Improved =

Breed of goat

The Hungarian Improved is a dairy goat breed found throughout Hungary. This goat breed originated from Swiss Dairy breeds, especially Saanen, crossed with local animals. They are found in black, white, red or cream.

== Sources ==
- Hungarian Improved Goat
