= Zhiwulin Black =

Breed of goat

The Zhiwulin Black goat breed from the northern Shaanxi Province of China is used for the production of cashmere fiber and meat.

Cross-breeding with the Liaoning Cashmere breed has been found to improve cashmere yields.

== See also ==
- Cashmere goat
