= Norwegian goat =

Breed of goat

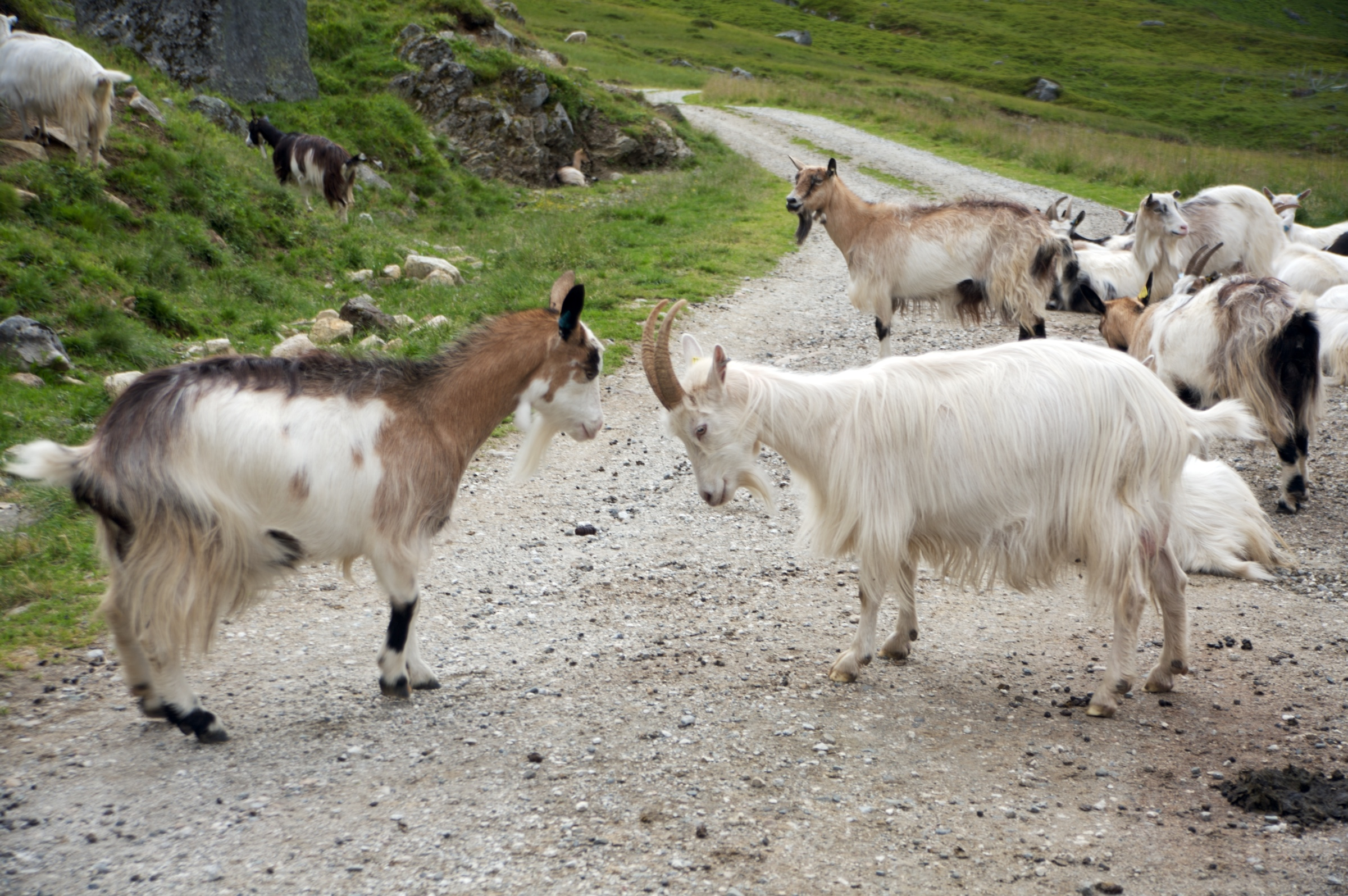
Norwegian goats

Norwegian goat breeds are used for the production of milk, cheese and meat. There are two primary Norwegian goat breeds, the Norwegian milk goat (norsk melkegeit) and the coastal goat (kystgeit). In addition there are smaller herds of Cashmere goats, Angora goats and Boer goats.
