= Philippine goat =

Breed of goat

The Philippine goat breed from the Philippines is used for the production of meat. 3.3 million goats were slaughtered for meat production there in 2018.

== Sources ==
- Philippine Goat
