= Tauernscheck =

Breed of goat

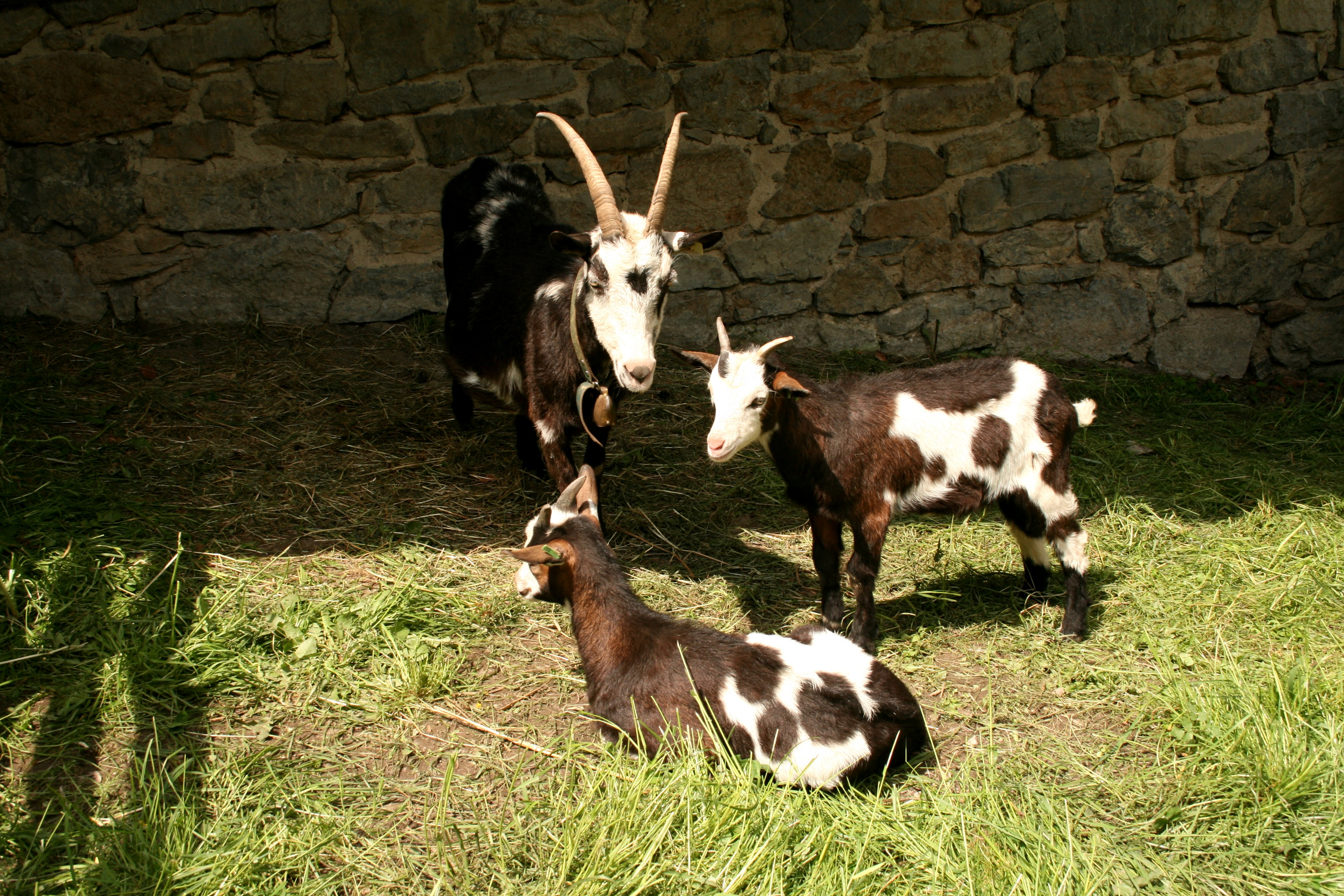
Tauernscheck Goats

The Tauernscheck goat breed from Austria is used for the production of milk. It is a very rare breed derived from the Austrian Landrace and Pinzgauer goat breeds.

== Sources ==
- "Tauernscheck Goat". Archived from the original on 23 December 2008.
