= Zalawadi =

Breed of goat

The Zalawadi goat breed from the Surendranagar and Rajkot regions of Gujarat in India is used for the production of milk, meat, and fiber. Zalawadi goats compromise 27.8% of the goat population in Surendranagar. The goats are also known by the local name Tara Bakari.

== Physical description ==
A long legged type of goat. Coat is predominantly black with speckled ears. Horns are upward and backward pointing corkscrews with drooping, leaf-shaped ears.

== Statistics ==
Milk yield = 2.02±0.18 kg in 197.2±5.8d of lactation with an average productive life of 5-6 lactations. The birth rate is 55% twins and 2% triplets.

== Sources ==
- Zalawadi goat
