= Asmari goat =

Breed of goat

Asmari
- Other names: Gujeri
- Country of origin: Afghanistan
- Distribution: Kunar province
- Use: Pack, Meat, Milk, Fibre

Traits
- Weight: Male: 50-90kg; Female: 45-60kg
- Height: Male: 70cm; Female: 53cm
- Horn status: Horned
- Goat; Capra aegagrus hircus

The Asmari is a large breed of goat originating in the Kunar Province of Afghanistan. They are a general purpose breed, and are mainly used as pack animals and grown for their meat and milk. They are well adapted to local conditions, making them an important livestock resource for local farmers.

On average, males grow to 70 cm in height and females grow to 53 cm in height, making them larger than the more popular Vatani breed. Males weigh 50–90 kg, while females weigh 45–60 kg. They have a small head and long neck. Asmari goats are generally white with a black neck and shoulders. Both males and females grow horns long enough to reach their shoulders.

Over a 120-day lactation period, the breed produces 90 kg of milk. They produce 500-700 grams of pashmina fibre a year. The hair is traditionally used to make ropes and tents.
