= Verata (goat breed) =

Spanish breed of goat

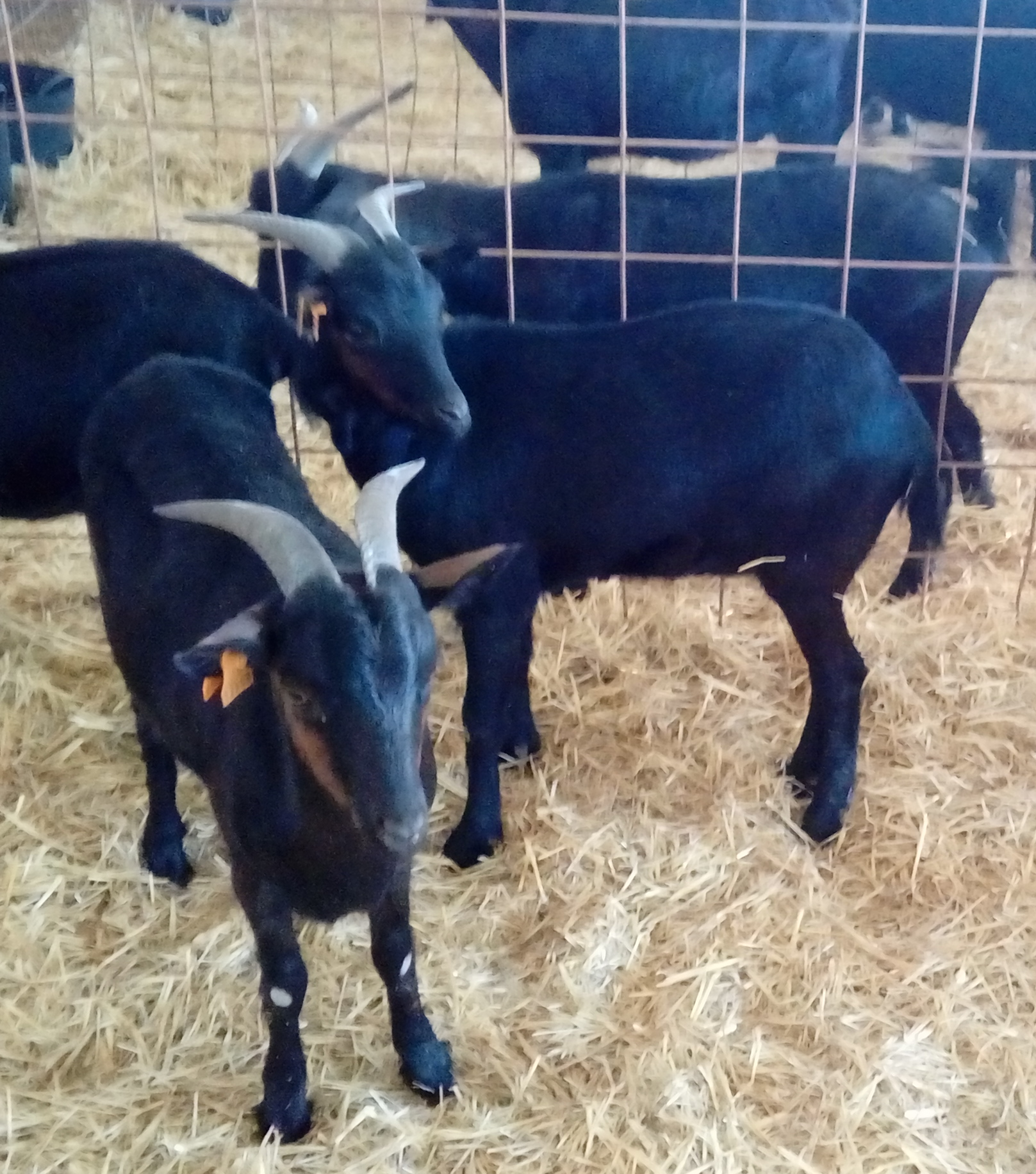

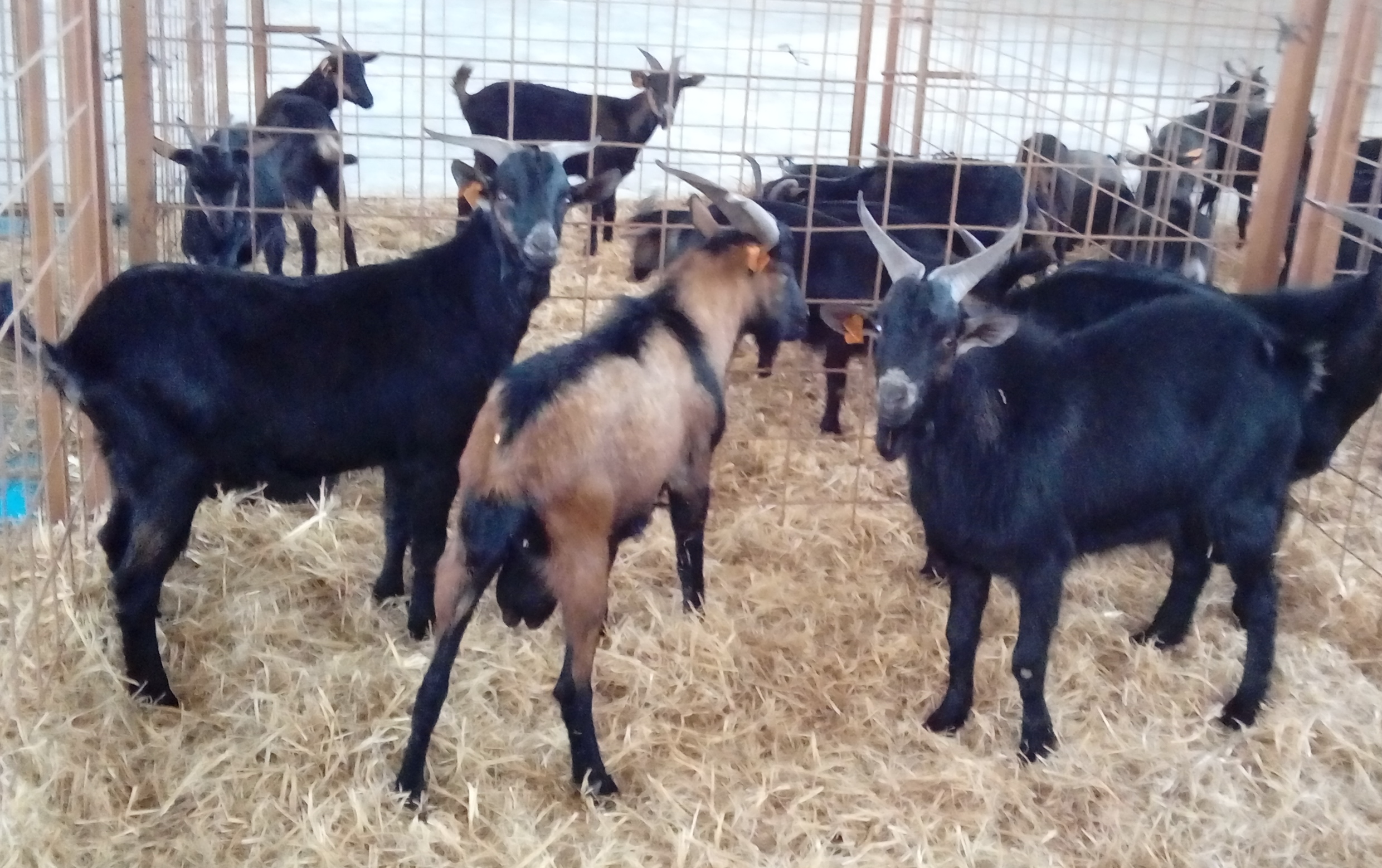
- At the Feria del Ganado of Jerez de la Frontera in 2016
- Conservation status: FAO (2007): not at risk
- Other names: Cabra Castellana; Cabra de los Montes de Toledo
- Country of origin: Spain
- Standard: MAPAMA
- Use: dual-purpose: meat, milk

Traits
- Weight: Male: 80 kg; Female: 70 kg
- Height: Male: 75 cm; Female: 60 cm
- Coat: black; blackish-brown; chestnut brown; grey
- Horn status: twisted horns in both sexes
- Beard: in males, and often in females
- Tassels: often present
- Goat; Capra aegagrus hircus

The Verata is a traditional Spanish breed of domestic goat. It is a dual-purpose breed, reared both for its meat and for its milk. It is named for, and is thought to originate in, the comarca of La Vera, in the province of Cáceres, in the northern part of the autonomous community of Extremadura in western central Spain. It is one of two traditional goat breeds in Extremadura, the other being the Retinta Extremeña.

== History ==
The Verata is a traditional and heterogeneous goat breed from the Tagus depression in western central Spain, bounded to the south by the Montes de Toledo and to the north by the western Sistema Central. It was traditionally reared in the Sierra de Gredos, in the area where the provinces of Ávila, Cáceres and Toledo meet. Towards the end of the twentieth century there was some displacement of the breed from its area of origin, the comarca of La Vera, into the comarca of Navalmoral de la Mata to the south.

A herd-book was established by the Ministerio de Agricultura, Pesca y Alimentación, the Spanish ministry of agriculture, in 1986. A breed association, the Asociación Extremeña de Criadores de Caprino de Raza Verata, received government approval in 2000, and in 2008 the Verata was included by royal decree in a list of indigenous livestock breeds at risk of extinction. A breeding programme was approved by the Junta of Extremadura in 2020.

The Verata population has been in decline since the early twentieth century, for reasons including both economic depression and the aging of the rural population in its area of distribution. In 1986 the total number for the breed was reported to be just under 100000 head; in 2024 it was 6554, consisting of 6040 breeding nannies and 265 billies. Its conservation status was listed as "at risk/vulnerable".

== Characteristics ==
The Verata usually varies in colour from jet-black to mahogany; a chestnut coat with dark belly and limbs also occurs. Horns are present in both sexxes; in the male they are close together at the base, rising vertically and then spiralling outwards. Billies are always beards, nannies often so.

The Verata displays marked sexual dimorphism: average heights at the shoulder are about 60 cm for nannies and 75 cm for billies, with corresponding body weights of 70 kg and 80 kg.

The goats are rustic and hardy, and are well adapted to a variety of types of terrain, from irrigated valley land to medium or high mountain pasture, where they are able to exploit vegetation that other animals cannot.

== Use ==
The Verata is a dual-purpose breed, reared both for milk and for meat. Milk yields are usually in the range 250–300 kg in a lactation of 180-240 days, but may reach 500 kg in some cases.

Kids are slaughtered either as suckling kid at an age of 30–35 days, when they weigh some 7–8 kg, or at Easter time at a live weight of between 20 and 28 kg.
