= Danish Landrace goat =

Breed of goat

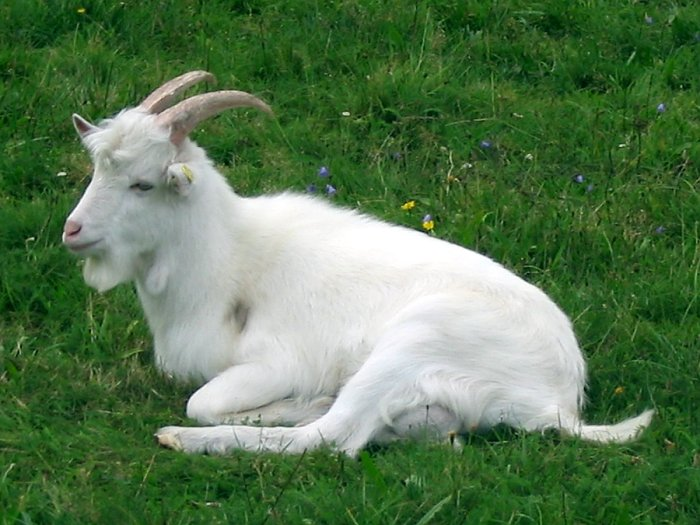
- At an open-air museum in Denmark
- Conservation status: FAO: at risk
- Other names: Danish: Dansk Landraceged
- Country of origin: Denmark
- Use: milk

Traits
- Weight: Male: 70–90 kg; Female: 50–60 kg
- Height: Male: 85–95 cm; Female: 75–80 cm
- Horn status: yes
- Beard: yes
- Tassels: yes
- Goat; Capra aegagrus hircus

The Danish Landrace (Danish: dansk landged) is a Danish breed of dairy goat.

== History ==
The oldest goat bones found in Denmark have been dated to 3400 BC. The Danish Landrace results from cross-breeding in the nineteenth century of indigenous local goats with imported German Braune Harzer Ziege and Swiss Saanen stock.

The breed association is the Foreningen for Danske Landracegeder; a herd-book was started in 1982. In 2018 the population was reported as 223 billies (males) and 1115 nannies (females).

== Characteristics ==
It is a medium-sized or large goat. Seven coat colours are recognised, including black and blue

== Use ==
It is used primarily for the production of milk, but is also raised for meat.
