= Capra Maltese =

Italian breed of goat

- Conservation status: FAO (2007): not at risk; DAD-IS (2026): endangered-maintained
- Other names: Maltese; Malteza
- Country of origin: Asia Minor
- Distribution: Basilicata; Calabria; Puglia; Sardinia; Sicily
- Standard: MIPAAF
- Use: milk

Traits
- Weight: Male: 70 kg; Female: 46 kg
- Height: Male: 87 cm; Female: 71 cm
- Skin colour: unpigmented, dark where the coat is black
- Hair colour: white
- Face colour: white with black sides, black crown and black ears
- Horn status: sometimes horned
- Beard: males usually bearded
- Tassels: may be present
- Goat; Capra aegagrus hircus

The Capra Maltese or Maltese is an Italian breed of domestic goat originating in the east and central Mediterranean area. It originates in Asia Minor, and takes its name from the island of Malta. It is raised mainly in southern Italy, and particularly in the islands of Sicily and Sardinia. Although the Mogħża Maltija of Malta is reported to DAD-IS, the official view is that there are no pure-bred specimens of the breed in the Maltese islands, though it remains possible that some modern Maltese goats are closely related to the original type. Similarly-named goats are also present in Greece, Turkey and the Maghreb.

== History ==
The Capra Maltese is a traditional breed of southern Italy and of the islands of Sicily and Sardinia. Although the breed name derives from the island of Malta, it is thought to have originated in the eastern Mediterranean. It may be the result of cross-breeding of goats of Tunisian origin with local goats of Italy.

It is one of the eight autochthonous Italian goat breeds for which a genealogical herd-book is kept by the Associazione Nazionale della Pastorizia, the Italian national association of sheep- and goat-breeders. The herd-book was established in 1976. The Italian population of the breed was estimated in 1983 to be about 70000, and in 2005 at 40000. At the end of 2013 the registered population was variously reported as 1934 and as 5401, while in 2024 it was reported to be 799, with 626 breeding nannies and 17 active billies.

== Characteristics ==
It is a long-haired white goat characterised by a raven-black area on the top and sides of the head and long pendulous black ears which turn outwards at the tip.

== Use ==
It is a valued milk breed; the milk has pleasant taste without an excessively "goaty" odour or flavour. Yield per lactation is 242±87 kg for primiparous, 307±141 kg for secondiparous, and 358±160 kg for pluriparous, nannies; it may reach 500–600 kg in 300 days. The milk has an average of 4.28% fat and 3.66% protein. In Sicily the milk is used to make ricotta and traditional caprino cheeses including Padduni, which has PAT status, and Formaggiu ri crapa.

Kids are slaughtered at a weight of 8–11 kg.
