= Charnequeira =

Breed of goat

The Charnequeira goat breed from Portugal is used for the production of meat and milk. It is normally of a red coloration.

== Sources ==
"Charnequeira Goat". Archived from the original on 23 December 2008.
