= Laoshan goat =

Breed of goat

Laoshan
- Conservation status: FAO (2007): not at risk
- Other names: Laoshan Dairy
- Country of origin: China
- Distribution: Shandong Province

Traits
- Weight: Male: 76 kg; Female: 48 kg
- Height: Male: 85 cm; Female: 71 cm
- Goat; Capra aegagrus hircus

The Laoshan goat breed from the Shandong Province of China is used for the production of milk. It is derived from the selective breeding of local goats crossed with Saanen goats first introduced to the area in 1904.
