= Finnish Landrace goat =

Breed of goat

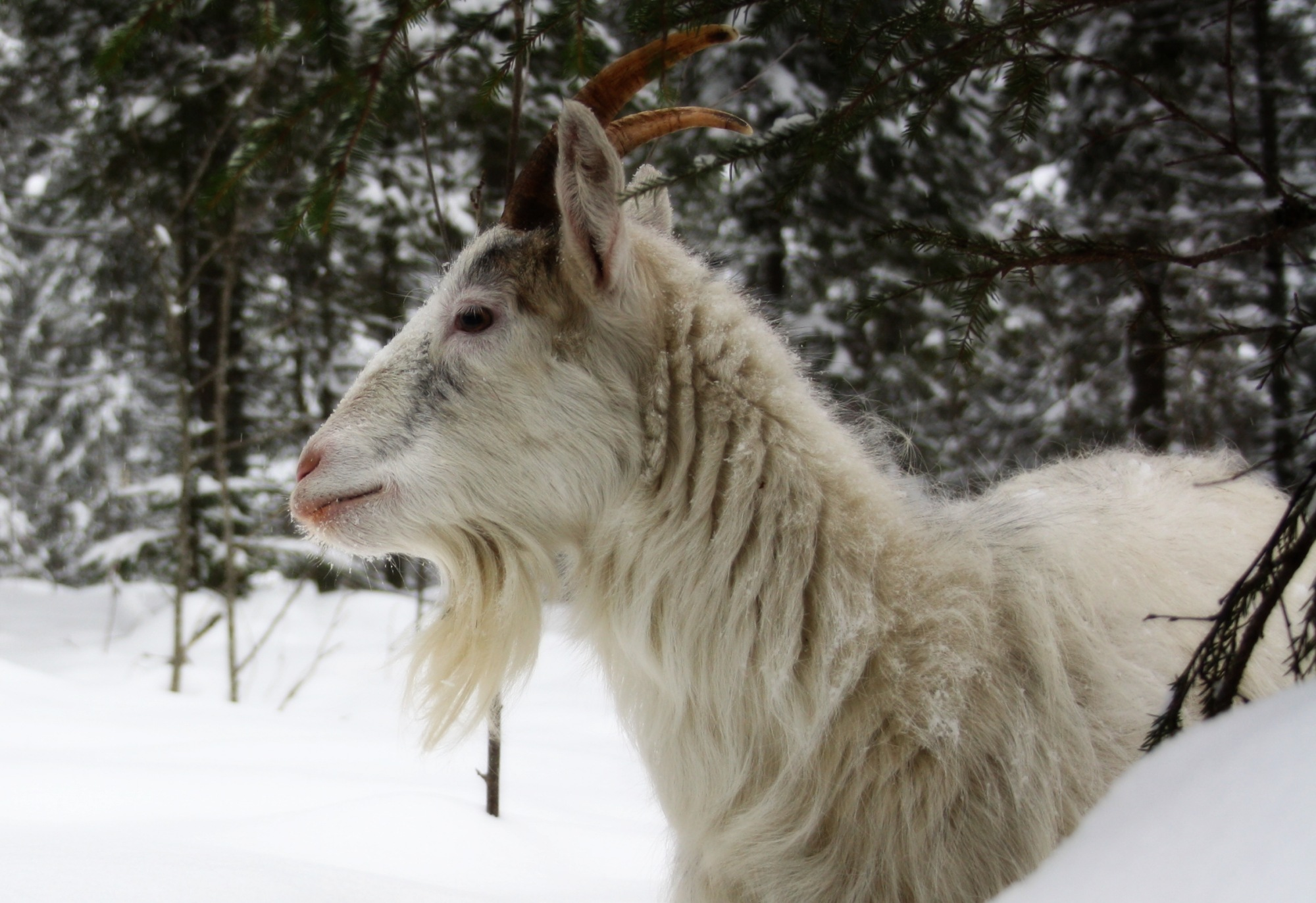
A Finnish landrace goat in winter

The Finnish Landrace, also called the Finngoat (Finnish: Suomenvuohi), is a landrace-derived breed of goat originating in western Finland. The breed can come in a variety of colors but is usually grey, pied, or white, and both horned and polled individuals occur. Finnish Landrace goats are typically used for milking, as there is not a strong tradition of goat meat in Finnish cuisine, unlike in southern Europe. Finngoats are the only breed of goat native to Finland, and originate from native goats crossed with other European imports, especially from Switzerland.

== See also ==
- Media related to Finnish Landrace goat at Wikimedia Commons
- List of goat breeds
- Finnsheep
