= Dutch Landrace goat =

Dutch breed of goat

Dutch Landrace
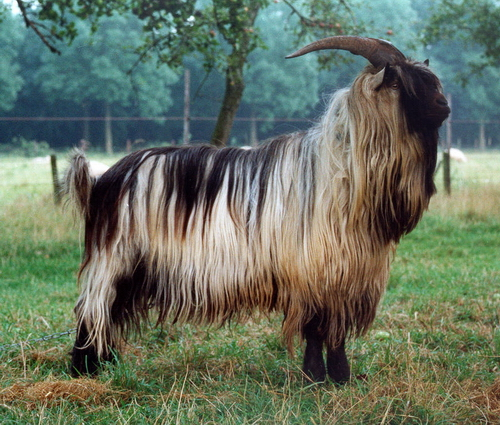
- Conservation status: FAO (2007): not at risk; DAD-IS (2020): at risk/endangered
- Other names: Dutch: Nederlandse Landgeit; Dutch: Veluwse Geit
- Country of origin: The Netherlands
- Distribution: The Netherlands
- Standard: Landelijke Fokkersclub Nederlandse Landgeiten (in Dutch)

Traits
- Weight: Male: average 75 kg; Female: average 60 kg
- Height: Male: 79 cm; Female: 67 cm
- Coat: black; blue; brown; grey; white; "wild-coloured"
- Horn status: lyre-shaped, scimitar or twisted; may reach 100 cm in length
- Beard: yes
- Goat; Capra aegagrus hircus

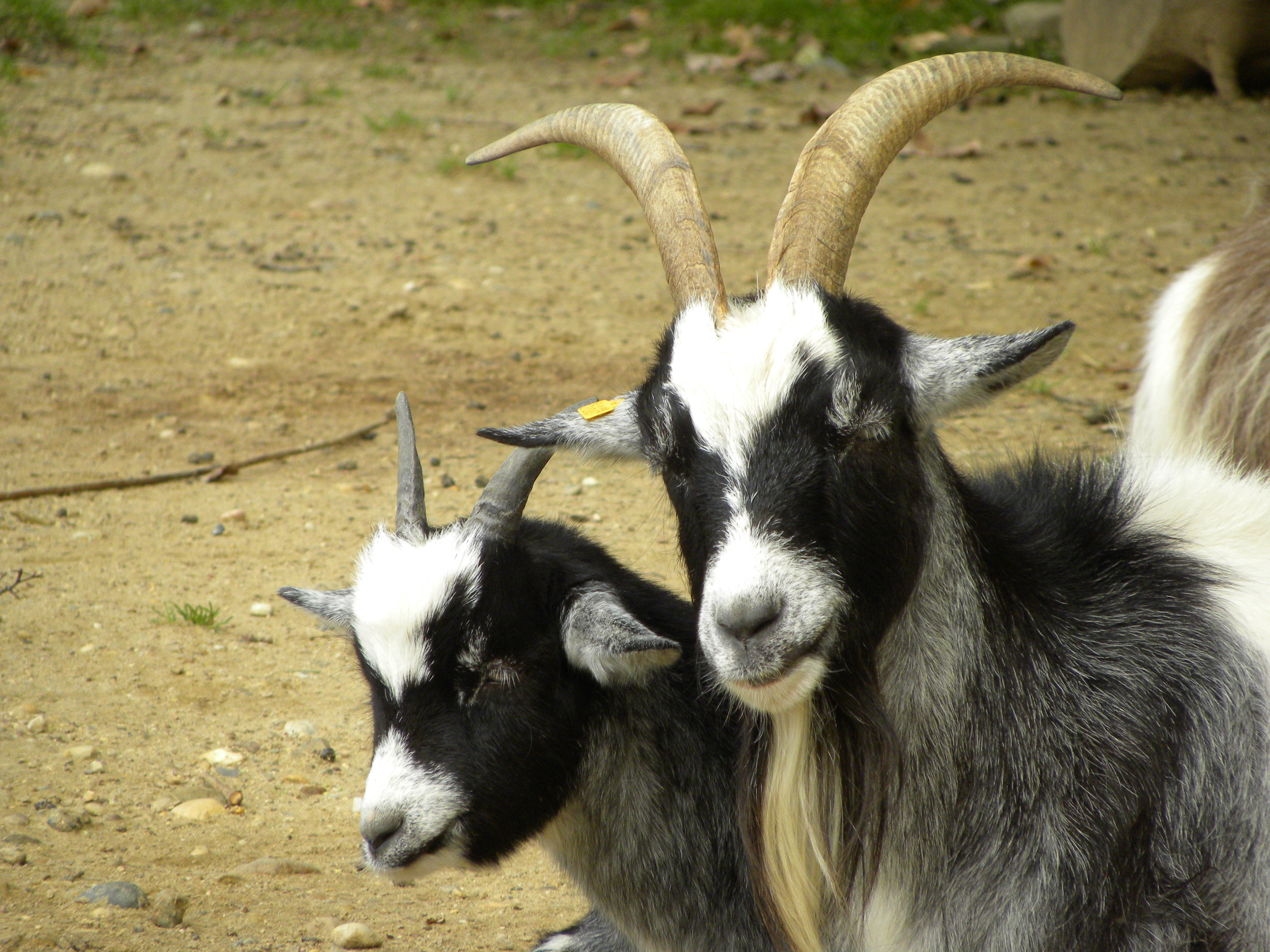
Nanny with kid

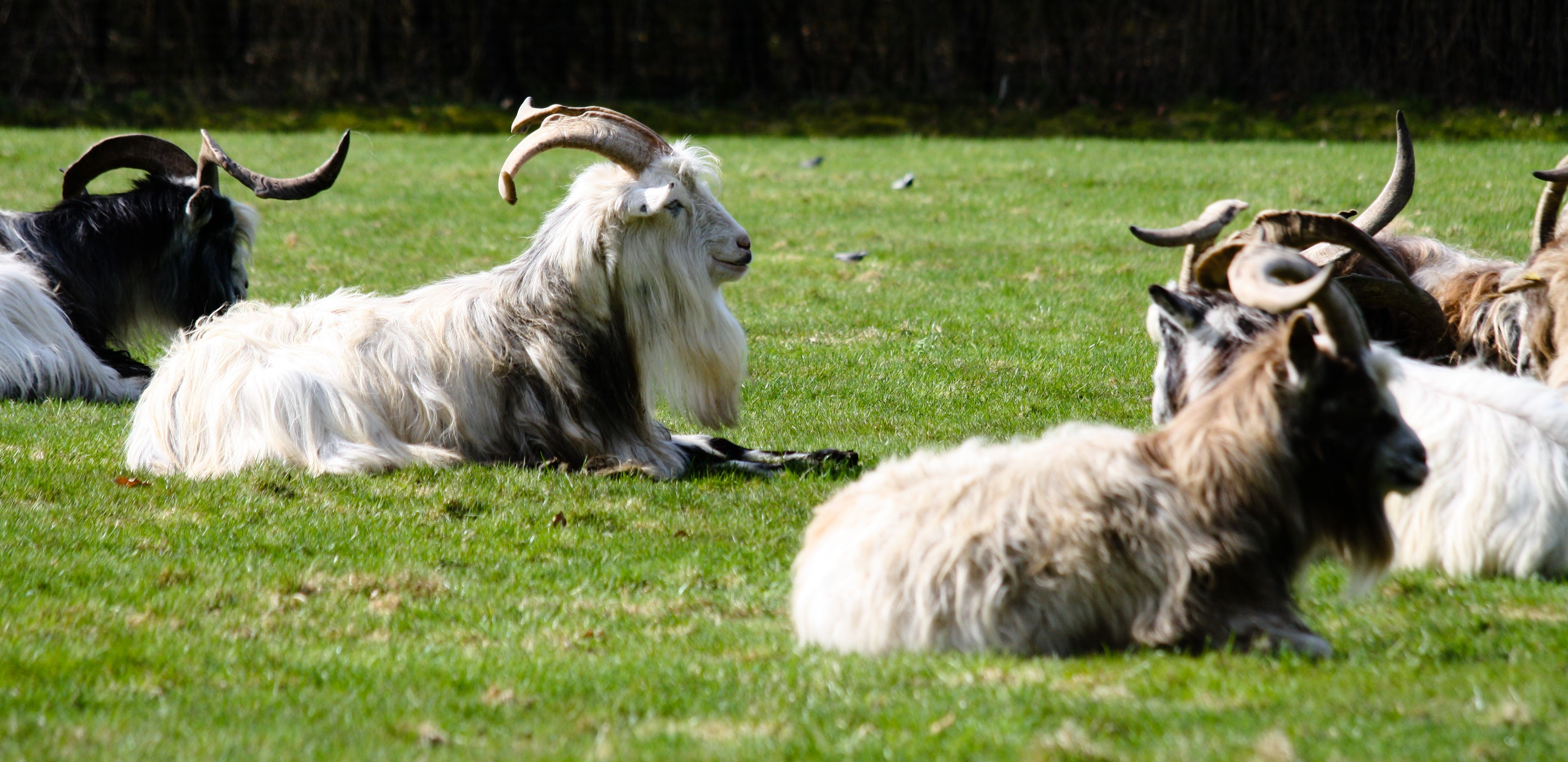
Coat colour and horn shape are variable

The Dutch Landrace is a traditional Dutch breed of domestic goat. It has been known in the Netherlands since the seventeenth century, and was formerly numerous there. It came close to extinction in the 1950s, but was saved by cross-breeding with unrelated goats, and by 2020 numbered over 2000 head.

== History ==
The Dutch Landrace has been known in the Netherlands since the seventeenth century, and was common until the early twentieth century, when Swiss Saanen and Toggenburg goats were imported in large numbers and cross-bred with local stock. By 1958 only one pair of the goats remained, and attempts to find others were unsuccessful. Because the descendants of these two goats were heavily inbred, the decision was taken to cross-breed them with a number of unrelated goats. Numbers grew, and by 2020 there were some 2000 nannies and 200 billies.

A breed association, the Landelijke Fokkersclub Nederlandse Landgeiten, was formed in 1982.

== Characteristics ==
The Dutch Landrace is stocky and of medium size, with fairly short legs. It may be of any colour but may not display Swiss markings; it is commonly black, blue, brown, grey, white or "wild-coloured". The coat is usually long and rough, but may also be short. The horns are commonly lyre-shaped, scimitar-shaped or twisted, and may reach 100 cm in length.
