= List of Italian goat breeds =

This is a list of some of the breeds of goat considered in Italy to be wholly or partly of Italian origin. Some may have complex or obscure histories, so inclusion here does not necessarily imply that a breed is predominantly or exclusively Italian.

- Alpina Comune
- Argentata dell'Etna
- Aspromonte
- Bianca Monticellana
- Bionda dell'Adamello
- Bormina
- Camosciata delle Alpi or Chamois Coloured Goat
- Campobasso Grigia Molisana
- Capestrina
- Di L'Aquila or Capra di L'Aquila
- Capra di Livo
- Capra di Potenza
- Capra di Teramo
- Caserta
- Ciavenesca
- Cilentana Fulva
- Cilentana Grigia
- Cilentana Nera
- Ciociara Grigia
- Delle Tremiti
- Derivata di Siria, see Rossa Mediterranea
- Di Benevento
- Di Campobasso
- Di Cosenza
- Fasana or Colombina
- Fiurina
- Foggiana
- Frisa Valtellinese or Frontalasca
- Garfagnina
- Garganica
- Girgentana
- Grigia Lucana
- Grigia Molisana
- Istriana
- Jonica
- Lariana
- Maltese
- Messinese
- Montecristo
- Murciana
- Napoletana
- Nera dei Nebrodi
- Nera Rustica
- Nicastrese
- Orobica
- Passeirer Gebirgsziege or Passiria
- Pedula
- Pezzata Mòchena or Valle dei Mòcheni
- Pezzata Rossa
- Pomellata
- Potentina
- Roccaverano
- Rossa Mediterranea or Derivata di Siria
- Rustica di Calabria or Sciara
- Salerno
- Sarda
- Sarda Primitiva
- Screziata
- Selvatica di Galite
- Selvatica di Joura
- Selvatica Samotracia
- Sempione
- Tavolara
- Valdostana
- Valfortorina
- Valgerola
- Valle del Chiese
- Valle di Fiemme
- Vallesana, Vallese or Valais Blackneck
- Valnerina
- Verzaschese or Nera Verzasca

== Foreign breeds ==
Italy also reports to DAD-IS the Saanen and Toggenburg breeds.
