= Di L'Aquila =

Italian breed of goat

- Conservation status: FAO (2007): endangered
- Other names: Capra di L'Aquila
- Country of origin: Italy
- Distribution: Province of L'Aquila
- Standard: MIPAAF
- Use: milk, meat

Traits
- Weight: Male: 70 kg; Female: 55–60 kg
- Height: Male: 75–80 cm; Female: 65–70 cm
- Coat: variable
- Horn status: horned or hornless
- Goat; Capra aegagrus hircus

The Di L'Aquila or Capra di L'Aquila is an Italian breed of domestic goat indigenous to the province of L'Aquila, in Abruzzo in southern Italy. It is raised only in that province. It is a heterogeneous breed with variable characteristics, showing the influence of introductions of Alpina Comune, Girgentana, Maltese and Toggenburg stock. It is large, hardy and productive. Management is extensive: the animals are kept on mountain pasture, and brought under cover for protection from the snow only in the winter months.

The Di L'Aquila is one of the forty-three autochthonous Italian goat breeds of limited distribution for which a herd-book is kept by the Associazione Nazionale della Pastorizia, the Italian national association of sheep- and goat-breeders. In 1983 the total population was estimated at 5000–6000. The herd-book was activated in 2002, but no stock has been recorded in it for many years; in 2007 the population was reported as 590.

== Use ==
The Di L'Aquila yields about 250–300 kg of milk per lactation, which in pluriparous nannies lasts on average 210 days.

Kids are slaughtered at a weight of 8–9 kg.
