= Bormina =

Italian breed of goat

- Conservation status: FAO (2007): no data
- Other names: Frisa Rossa
- Country of origin: Italy
- Distribution: Valtellina, Province of Sondrio
- Standard: none (not recognised)
- Use: milk

Traits
- Coat: reddish, with Swiss markings
- Horn status: usually horned
- Beard: males usually bearded
- Goat; Capra aegagrus hircus

The Bormina is an Italian breed of domestic goat findigenous to the Valtellina, in the northern part of the province of Sondrio, in Lombardy in northern Italy. It is particularly associated with the area of the comune of Bormio, from which its name derives. Because of the reddish colour of its coat and its clear Swiss markings (Italian: frisature, white stripes on the face, white legs, belly and peri-anal area), it may also be call the Frisa Rossa. It is raised mainly in the Valtellina but is also reported from the Lario and from the area of Varese. It does not have official recognition in Italy, and breed numbers are very low. Management is extensive: the animals are kept on high alpine pasture in the summer months, and brought under cover in winter.

== History ==
The origins of the Bormina are unknown. It may derive from Toggenburg stock from north-east Switzerland imported to the Valtellina in 1941 and 1942 for its high productivity of milk, and cross-bred with local strains, or may have arisen from older traditional long-term cultural interchange. The Bormina also shows similarity to the Bionda dell'Adamello breed from the Val Camonica.

The Bormina is not officially recognised as a breed, and is not among the forty-three autochthonous Italian goat breeds of limited distribution for which a herdbook is kept by the Associazione Nazionale della Pastorizia, the Italian national association of sheep- and goat-breeders. It is, however, reported to the DAD-IS database of the FAO. Numbers were reported at 100 in 1992; there is no more recent data. The breed is under competitive pressure from the Frisa Valtellinese or Frontalasca, which is raised in the same geographical area.

== Use ==
The Bormina is an excellent dairy breed.
