= Bionda dell'Adamello =

Breed of goat

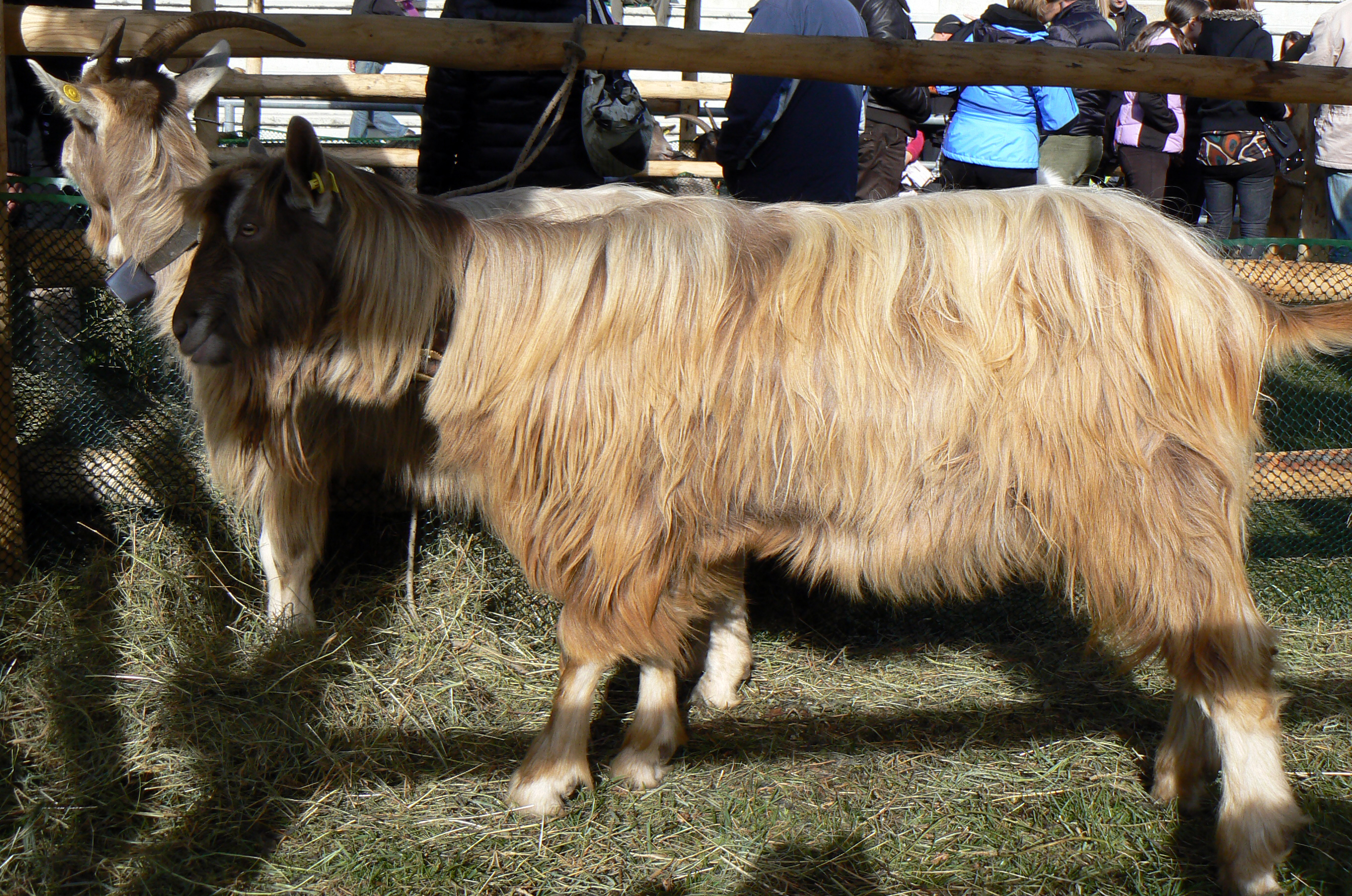
- Conservation status: FAO (2007): not at risk
- Other names: Bionda; Mustàscia
- Country of origin: Italy
- Distribution: Lombardy; Trentino
- Standard: MIPAAF
- Use: milk, also meat

Traits
- Weight: Male: 70–75 kg; Female: 55–60 kg
- Height: Female: 74 cm
- Hair colour: from pale gold to brown
- Face colour: white facial stripes
- Horn status: males horned, females usually so
- Beard: males bearded, females usually so
- Tassels: present, usually white
- Goat; Capra aegagrus hircus

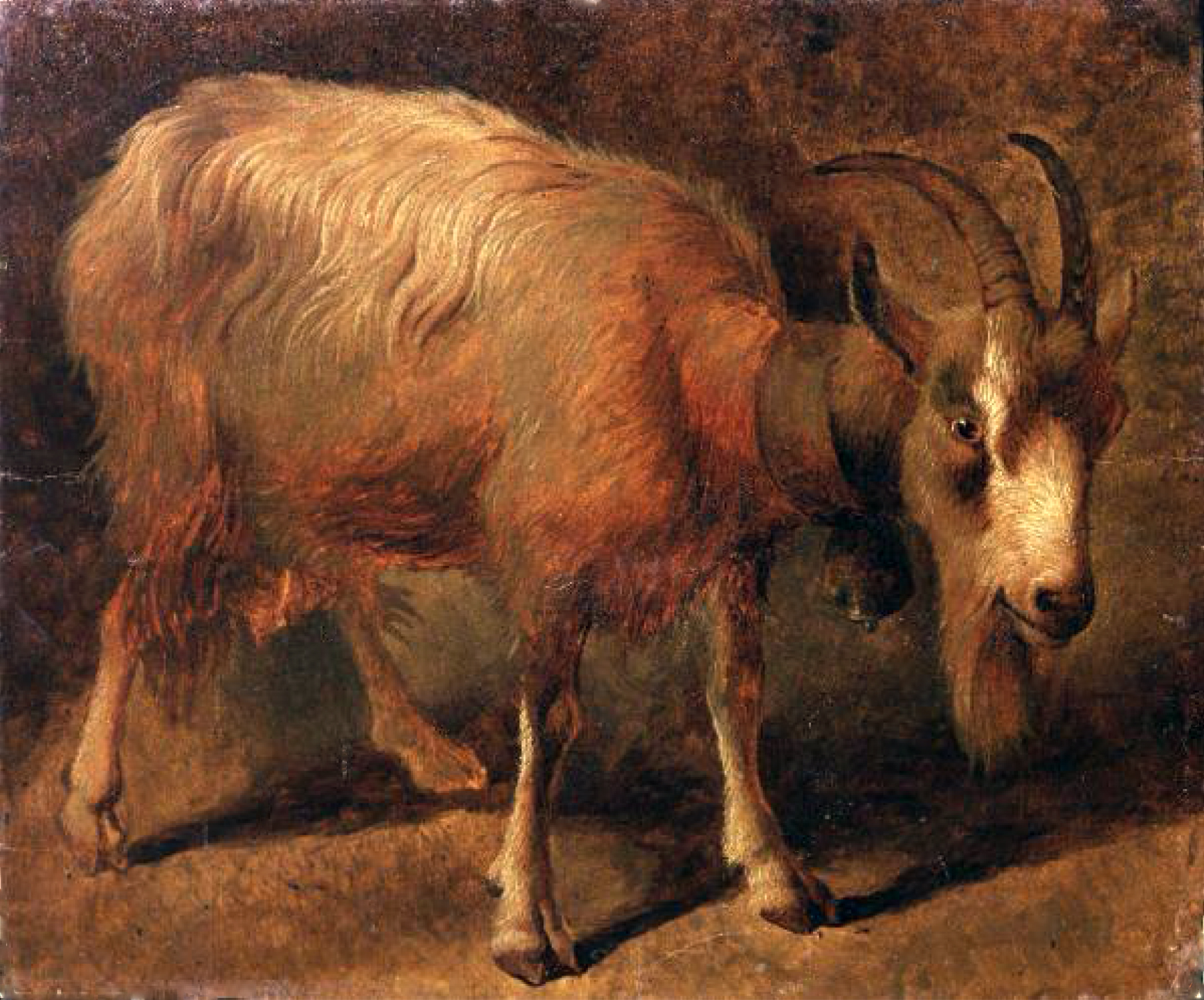
Painting from c. 1760 by Francesco Londonio (1723–1786), showing a goat of Bionda dell'Adamello type, with typical coat and facial markings (Accademia Carrara, Bergamo)

The Bionda dell'Adamello is an Italian breed of domestic goat from the Val Camonica in the province of Brescia, in Lombardy in northern Italy. It takes its name from the massif of the Adamello, part of the Adamello-Presanella subsection of the Rhaetian Alps. It is raised mainly in the Val Camonica, the Val Saviore and the mountains of Brescia; some are found in neighbouring areas of the provinces of Bergamo to the west and Trento to the east. It was in the past known simply as the Capra Bionda or as the Mustàscia.

== History ==
The breed appears to be of ancient origin. While it shares some characteristics with the Swiss Toggenburger, notably the "Swiss markings" (white facial stripes, white lower limbs and peri-anal area), it was already established well before the importation of Toggenburg billies to the area, documented from the years before and after the Second World War. A painting from about 1760 by the Milanese painter Francesco Londonio (1723–1786) shows a goat of Bionda dell'Adamello type, with typical coat and facial markings.

The Bionda dell'Adamello is one of the forty-three autochthonous Italian goat breeds of limited distribution for which a herd-book is kept by the Associazione Nazionale della Pastorizia, the Italian national association of sheep- and goat-breeders. The herd-book was activated in 1997. At the end of 2013 the registered population was variously reported as 3148 and as 2772.

== Use ==
The milk yield per lactation of the Bionda dell'Adamello is 303±108 kg for secondiparous, and 361±122 kg for pluriparous, nannies. The milk averages 3.16% milk-fat and 2.97% milk protein. It is used mostly to make Mascarpì, a kind of ricotta, and the smoked caprino cheese Fatulì, which has PAT status and is listed in the Ark of Taste of the Slow Food Foundation.
