= Sempione =

Sempione may refer to:

- Passo del Sempione, Italian for Simplon Pass
- Sempione goat, breed of domestic goat from the mountains of Piemonte in north-western Italy
- Parco Sempione, park in Milan, Italy
- 231st Signal Battalion "Sempione", signals unit of the Italian Army

== See also ==
- Simplon (disambiguation)
