= Nera Verzasca =

Swiss breed of goat

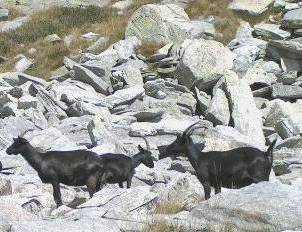
- Conservation status: FAO (2007): not at risk
- Other names: Verzaschese; Nera di Verzasca; Nera Verzascaziege
- Country of origin: Switzerland
- Distribution: canton of Ticino; Lombardy, Italy
- Standard: MIPAAF
- Use: milk, also meat

Traits
- Weight: Male: 90 kg; Female: 45–60 kg
- Height: Male: 86 cm; Female: 74–76 cm
- Coat: black
- Face colour: black
- Horn status: horned in both sexes
- Beard: males bearded
- Goat; Capra aegagrus hircus

The Nera Verzasca, also known as the Nera di Verzasca or Verzaschese, is a Swiss breed of black domestic goat from the Valle Verzasca, in the canton of Ticino in southern Switzerland, from which it takes its name. It is raised in that area and in the provinces of Como, Varese and Verbano Cusio Ossola in northern Lombardy, in the north of Italy.

== History ==
The Verzaschese originates in the Valle Verzasca, in the canton of Ticino in southern Switzerland, from which it takes its name.

In Italy it is one of the forty-three autochthonous goat breeds of limited distribution for which a herdbook is kept by the Associazione Nazionale della Pastorizia, the Italian national association of sheep- and goat-breeders. In Switzerland the Nera Verzasca is among the endangered breeds for which a herd-book is kept by the Schweizerischer Ziegenzuchtverband or Federazione svizzera d'allevamento caprino, the Swiss federation of cantonal goat breeders' associations. In 2010 the total population in the two countries was 3014, of which 1902, or about 63%, were in Italy. At the end of 2013 the registered population in Italy was variously reported as 1388 and as 1529, and that in Switzerland was 2200–2300.

== Use ==
The average milk yield per lactation of the Nera Verzasca was measured in 2003 at 185 litres for primiparous, 318 litres for secondiparous, and 365 litres for pluriparous, nannies; a study in 2008–2010 found an average yield of 373 litres in 208 days, with an average of 3.50% fat and 3.06% protein. In Italy the milk is used to make caprino cheeses such as Formaggella del Luinese, which has DOP status, while in Switzerland much of it is made into Büscion, a fresh goat's-milk cheese; ricotta is made in both areas.

Kids are slaughtered at an average age of 41 days, at an average weight of 14 kg.
