= Passeirer Gebirgsziege =

Italian breed of goat

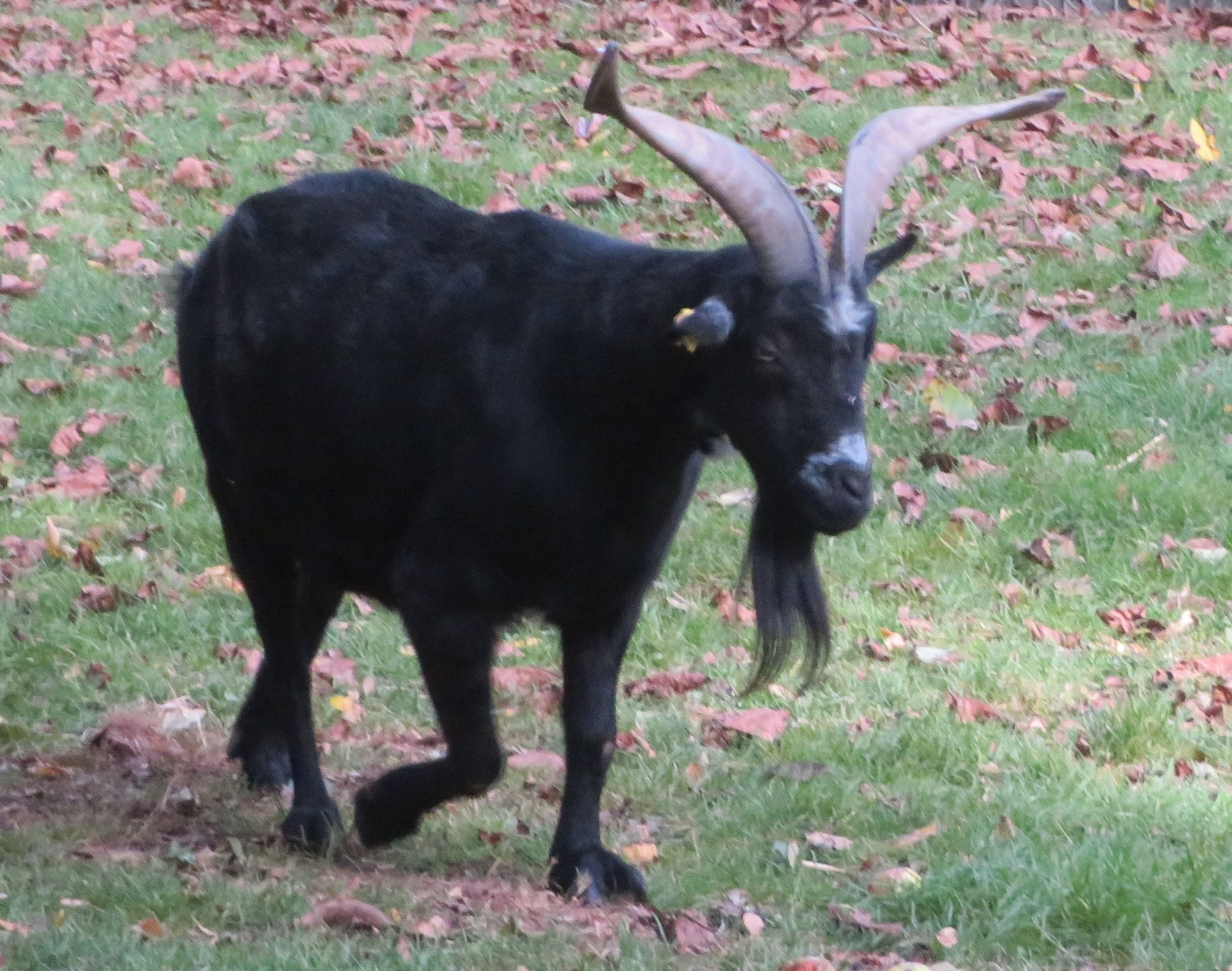
- Conservation status: FAO (2007): no data; DAD-IS (2023): not at risk
- Other names: Capra Passiria
- Country of origin: Italy
- Distribution: Autonomous Province of Bolzano
- Standard: MIPAAF
- Use: formerly milk, now mainly meat

Traits
- Weight: Male: 75 kg; Female: 60 kg
- Coat: variable, sometimes with Swiss markings
- Horn status: horned in both sexes
- Goat; Capra aegagrus hircus

The Passeirer Gebirgsziege or Capra Passiria is an Italian breed of domestic goat indigenous to the Passeier valley or Val Passiria, in the Autonomous Province of Bolzano in north-eastern Italy. It is raised in that valley and in the neighbouring Sarntal (Val Sarentino), Schnalstal (Val Senales) and upper Wipptal (Alta Vall'Isarco) valleys; it is also present in neighbouring areas of southern Austria. While of Alpine type, it is morphologically quite distinct from the Alpina Comune goat breed. Management is extensive: the animals are kept on alpine pasture from early spring to late autumn.

The Passeirer Gebirgsziege is one of the forty-three autochthonous Italian goat breeds of limited distribution for which a herd-book is kept by the Associazione Nazionale della Pastorizia, the Italian national association of sheep- and goat-breeders. At the end of 2013 the registered population was variously reported as 3354 and as 2531. The population reported for 2021 was just over 11000 head, and the conservation status of the breed in 2023 was 'not at risk'.
