= Messinese goat =

Italian breed of goat

Messinese
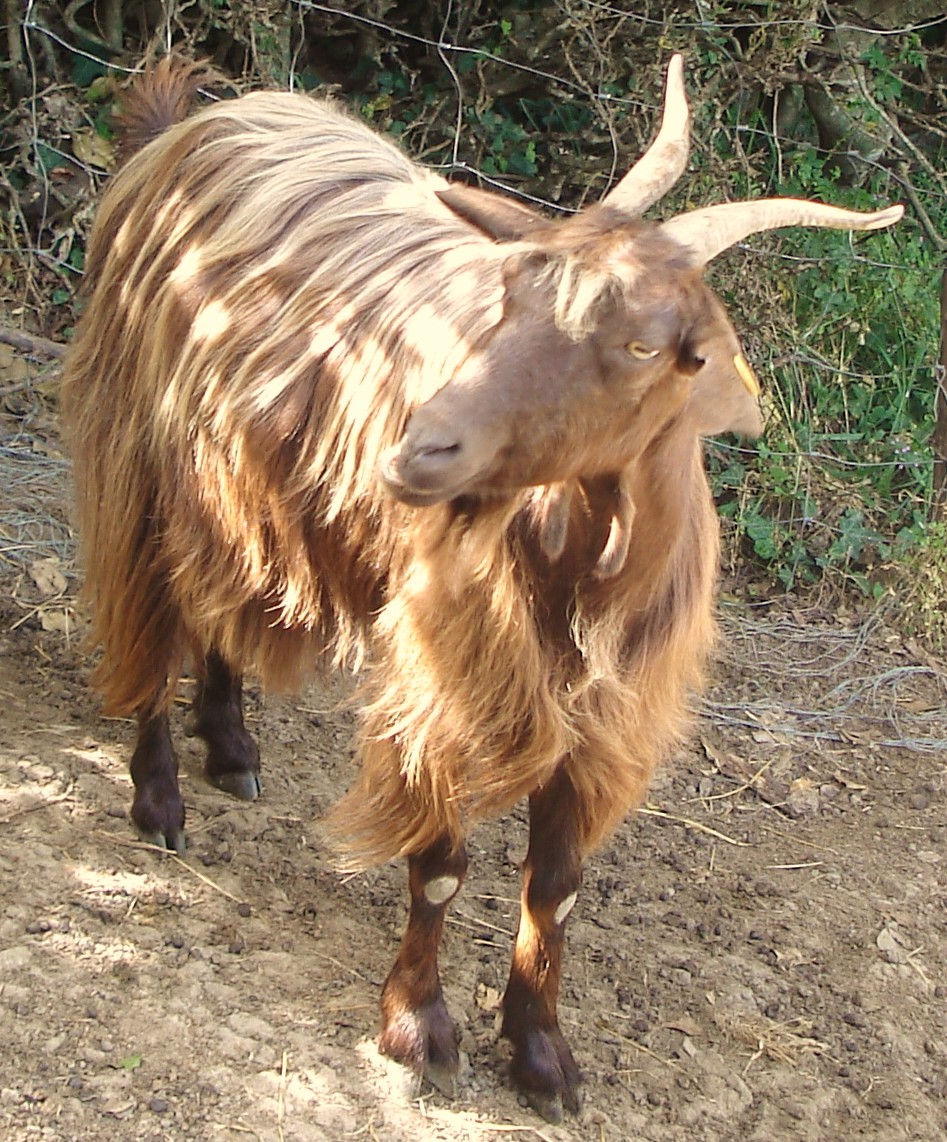
- A billy
- Conservation status: FAO (2007): not at risk
- Other names: Capra dei Nebrodi; Siciliana Comune
- Country of origin: Italy
- Distribution: Sicily
- Standard: MIPAAF
- Use: meat, milk

Traits
- Weight: Male: 72 kg; Female: 38 kg
- Height: Male: 72 cm; Female: 67 cm
- Skin colour: dark or pale according to coat colour
- Coat: very variable
- Horn status: usually horned
- Beard: bearded
- Tassels: present
- Goat; Capra aegagrus hircus

The Messinese is an Italian breed of domestic goat indigenous to the area of the Monti Nebrodi and the Monti Peloritani in the province of Messina, in the Mediterranean island of Sicily in southern Italy. It is raised mainly in those areas, but also in the provinces of Catania, Enna and Palermo. Its range partly overlaps that of the Argentata dell'Etna. The breed was officially recognised and a herd-book established in 2001. It was previously known either as the Capra dei Nebrodi (in that area) or in general as the Siciliana Comune.

The Messinese is one of the forty-three autochthonous Italian goat breeds of limited distribution for which a herd-book is kept by the Associazione Nazionale della Pastorizia, the Italian national association of sheep- and goat-breeders. At the end of 2013 the registered population was variously reported as 9814 and as 10409; the total population is estimated at 42000.

== Characteristics ==
The Messinese is of medium size: nannies stand on average 67 cm at the withers, with an average body weight of 38 kg; billies are on average about 5 cm taller, and weigh approximately 72 kg. The coat is very very variable, and may be solid-coloured, mottled or patched in black, brown, red or white; the hair is long.

The goats are frugal and rustic, well able to forage in scrub or poor pasture and on steep terrain. Prolificity (the average number of kids per birth) is about 125% and fertility (the number of births per pregnancy) is approximately 88%; the average age at first parturition is 17 months.

== Use ==
The Messinese is reared principally for kid meat. Kids are usually slaughtered at between 30 and 40 days old.

The milk yield per lactation is 137±66 kg for primiparous, kg for secondiparous, and 188±36 kg for pluriparous, nannies. The milk averages 5.83% milk-fat and 4.13% milk protein, and is used mostly to make caprino and mixed-milk cheeses.

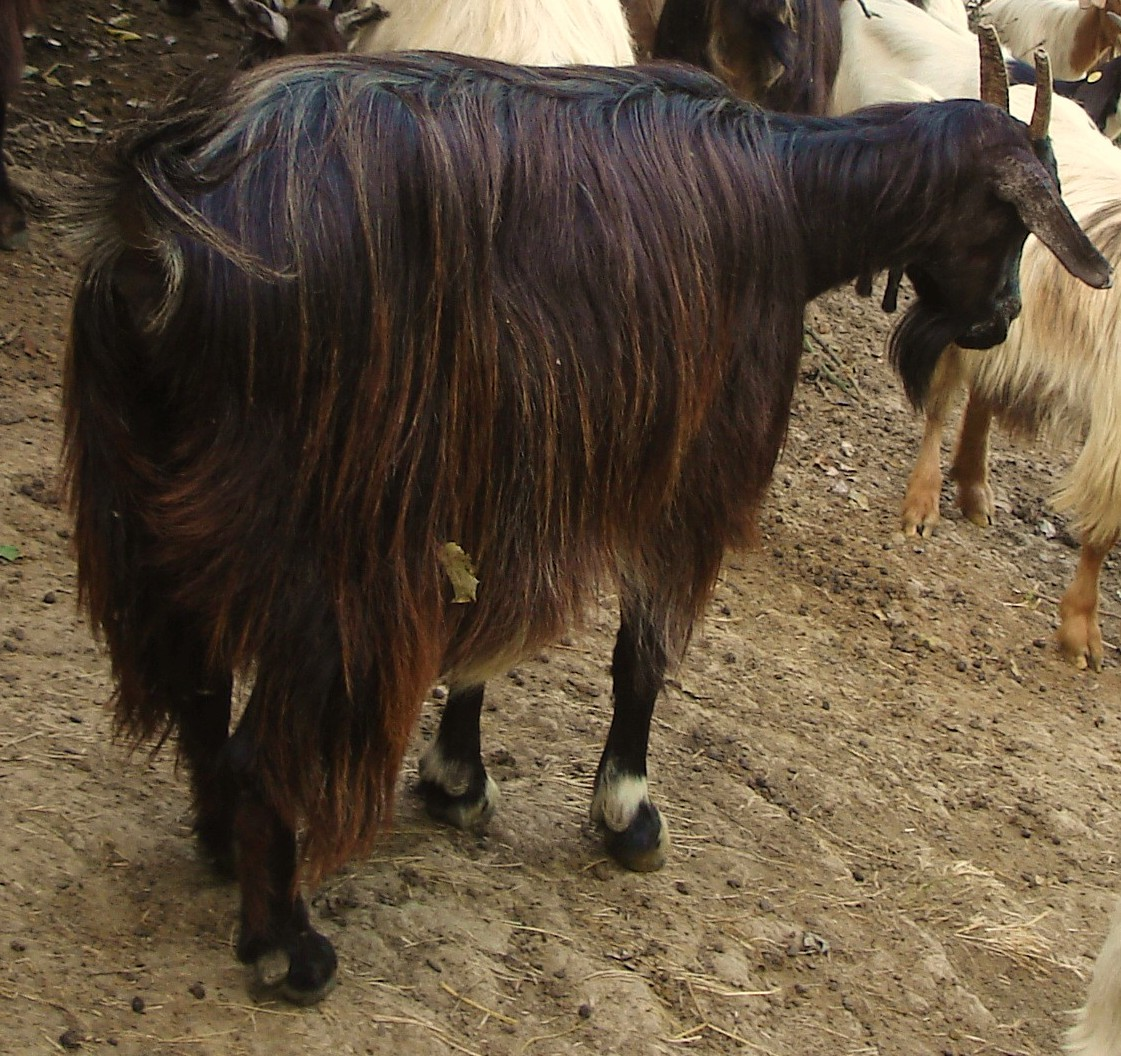

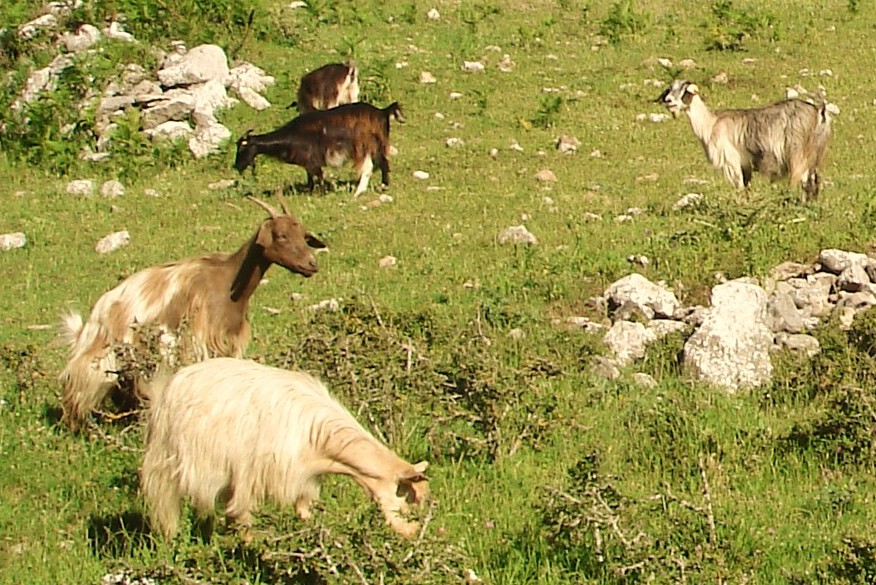
In Alcara li Fusi

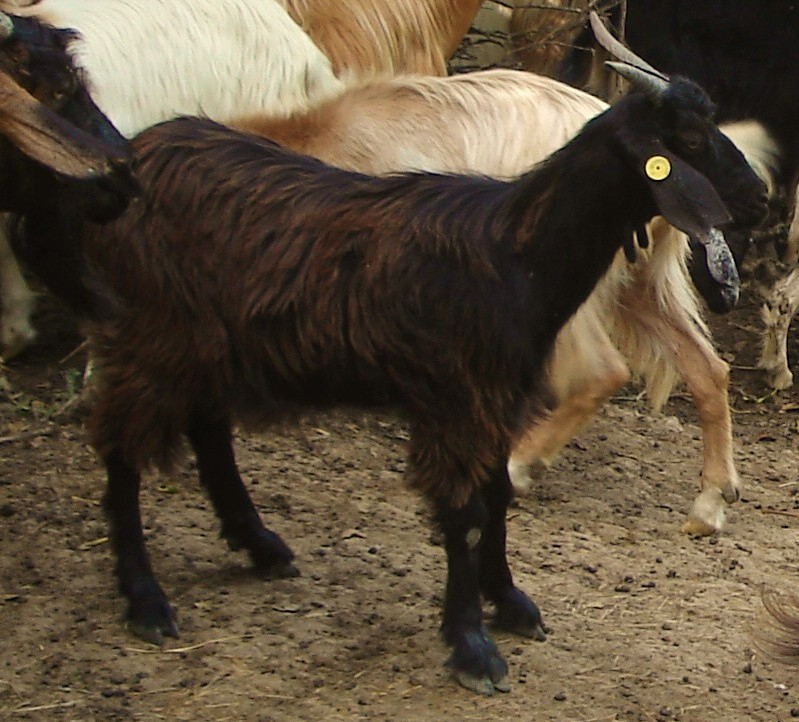
A kid
