= Nicastrese goat =

Italian breed of goat

Nicastrese
- Conservation status: FAO (2007): critical
- Other names: Jèlina
- Country of origin: Italy
- Distribution: Calabria
- Standard: MIPAAF
- Use: dual-purpose, milk and meat

Traits
- Weight: Male: 78 kg; Female: 46 kg
- Height: Male: 78 cm; Female: 71 cm
- Skin colour: grey-black, pink on underparts
- Coat: grey-black with white underparts
- Face colour: black with lateral white stripes
- Horn status: usually horned
- Beard: usually bearded
- Tassels: usually present, sometimes on one side only
- Goat; Capra aegagrus hircus

The Nicastrese is an Italian breed of domestic goat indigenous to Calabria, in southern Italy. It originates in the province of Catanzaro, and takes its name from the former town of Nicastro, which since 1968 has been part of Lamezia Terme. The Nicastrese is raised mainly in the area of origin, but also in the neighbouring provinces of Cosenza and Reggio Calabria. Photographic evidence suggests that it may be closely connected to the old "Araba" breed of the area.

The Nicastrese is one of the forty-three autochthonous Italian goat breeds of limited distribution for which a herdbook is kept by the Associazione Nazionale della Pastorizia, the Italian national association of sheep- and goat-breeders. The breed was officially recognised in June 2004. On 1 January 2002 the total number for the breed was estimated at 8000; at the end of 2013 the registered population was variously reported as 4975 and as 4454.

== Use ==
The average milk yield of the Nicastrese is 180 litres in 150 days for primiparous, 220 litres in 210 days for secondiparous, and 260 litres in 210 days for pluriparous, nannies. The milk averages 4.3% fat, 3.5% protein and 4.7% lactose. It is used to make caprino cheeses such as the Giuncata di capra calabra, and mixed cheeses such as Cacioricotta and Canestrato, which in Calabria have PAT status, and Pecorino Crotonese, which has DOP status.
