= Sarda Primitiva =

Italian breed of goat

- Conservation status: FAO (2007): not listed
- Other names: Sarda primitiva
- Country of origin: Sardinia, Italy
- Distribution: Ogliastra; Sarrabus-Gerrei; Sulcis-Iglesiente
- Standard: MIPAAF

Traits
- Weight: Male: 60–65 kg; Female: 50–55 kg
- Height: Male: 75 cm; Female: 65 cm
- Hair colour: variable
- Horn status: usually horned in both sexes
- Goat; Capra aegagrus hircus

The Sarda Primitiva is an Italian breed of domestic goat indigenous to the Mediterranean island of Sardinia, off the west coast of Italy. It is quite distinct from the better-known Sarda breed of goat. It is raised in the mountainous areas of the historic sub-regions of Ogliastra, of Sarrabus-Gerrei and of Sulcis-Iglesiente. It is one of the forty-three autochthonous Italian goat breeds of limited distribution for which a herd-book is kept by the Associazione Nazionale della Pastorizia, the Italian national association of sheep- and goat-breeders.

== History ==
The Sarda Primitaiva is a traditional breed indigenous to the Mediterranean island of Sardinia; it has not undergone cross-breeding with other goats.

At the end of 2013 the registered population was 5399, including 210 billies and 5173 nannies, distributed over 55 farms, of which all but one were the Province of Nuoro.

A population of fairly similar goats is or was present on the Sardinian island of Tavolara, in the Province of Sassari, and so is known as the Capra di Tavolara.

== Characteristics ==
The Sarda Primitiva is highly variable, both morphologically and in colouring. It is generally of small to medium size: billies weigh some 60–65 kg and stand on average 75 cm at the shoulder; nannies are about 10 kg lighter and 10 cm shorter. The coat may be black (eumelanic), white, roan grey or red (phaeomelanic), or be bi-coloured or tri-coloured, all with or without other patches of colour or 'wild-type' markings such as a dark dorsal stripe or dark stripes on the face. The head is fairly small, with an almost straight profile; it is usually bearded, and usually horned in both sexes. Tassels may or may not be present.

== Use ==
The goats are reared in medium-sized or large flocks; management is partly or entirely extensive. The pasture available to them is often variable, and is commonly characterised by sparse vegetation and arid or rocky terrain.
