= Valfortorina =

Italian breed of goat

- Conservation status: FAO (2007): critical
- Other names: Capra di Benevento
- Country of origin: Italy
- Distribution: province of Benevento
- Standard: MIPAAF
- Use: milk

Traits
- Weight: Male: 70 kg; Female: 60 kg
- Height: Male: 85 cm; Female: 75 cm
- Coat: variable
- Horn status: usually hornless
- Goat; Capra aegagrus hircus

The Valfortorina or Capra di Benevento is a rare breed of domestic goat from the Val Fortore in the province of Benevento, in Campania in southern Italy. It survives in very low numbers, and its conservation status was listed as "critical" by the Food and Agriculture Organization of the United Nations in 2007. A small number are kept at Benevento by the Consorzio per la Sperimentazione, Divulgazione e Applicazione di Biotecniche Innovative (ConsDABI), the institution responsible for the conservation of genetic resources in Italy.

The Valfortorina is one of the forty-three autochthonous Italian goat breeds of limited distribution for which a herdbook is kept by the Associazione Nazionale della Pastorizia, the Italian national association of sheep- and goat-breeders. There has been no entry in the herdbook for many years. At the end of 2008 a population of 49 was reported.

== Use ==
Data from 1983 gives a milk yield for the Valfortorina of 300–350 kg in 240–270 days for pluriparous nannies.
