= Frisa Valtellinese =

Italian breed of goat

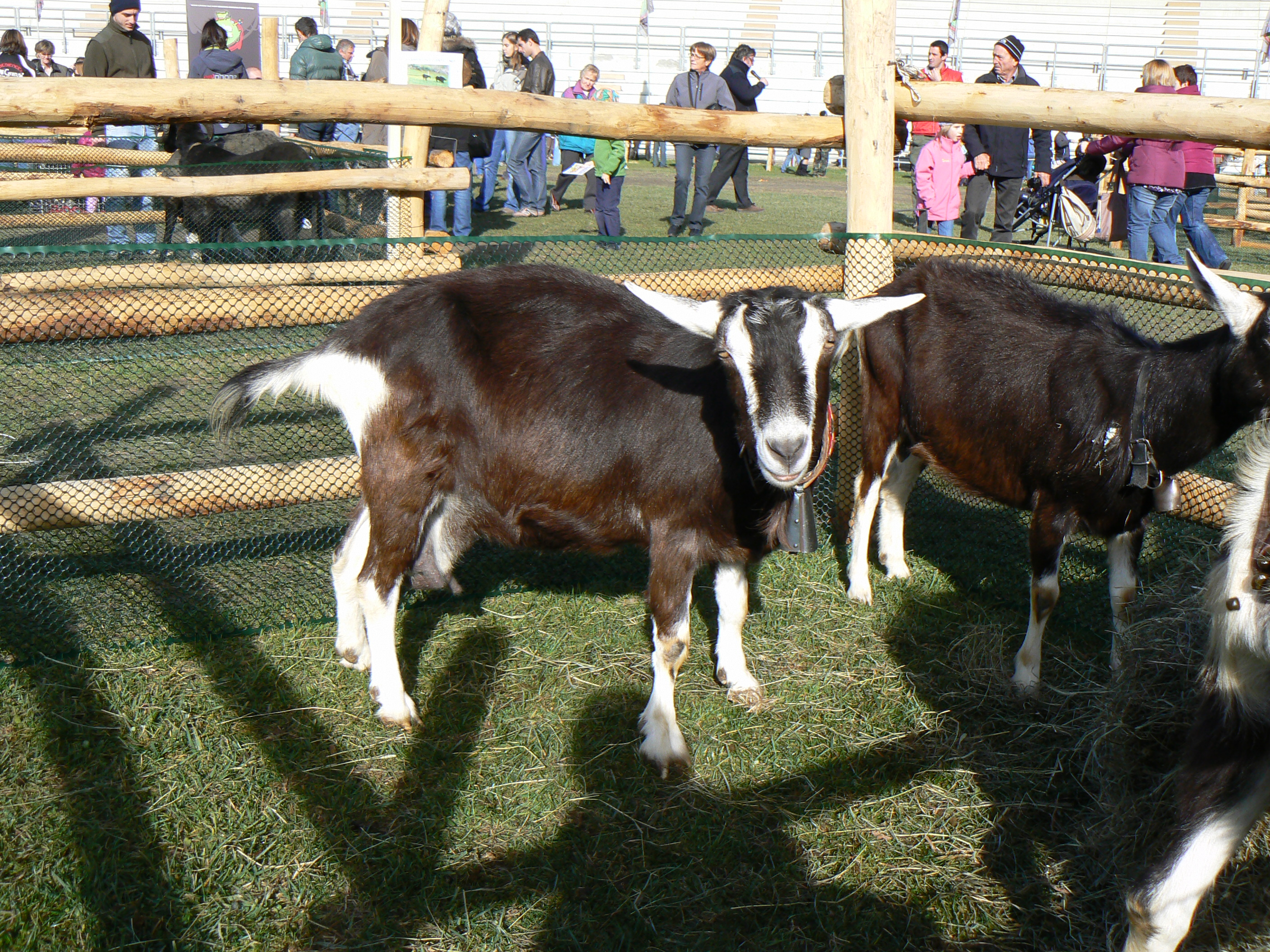
- Conservation status: FAO (2007): endangered
- Other names: Frontalasca; Rezzalasca; Frisa; Frisa Nera
- Country of origin: Italy
- Distribution: Province of Sondrio, Lombardy
- Standard: MIPAAF
- Use: milk, also meat

Traits
- Weight: Female: 65–70 kg
- Height: Female: 79–82 cm
- Coat: black or dark, with Swiss markings
- Face colour: dark with white eye-stripes
- Horn status: usually horned
- Tassels: sometimes present
- Goat; Capra aegagrus hircus

The Frisa Valtellinese is an Italian breed of domestic goat indigenous to the province of Sondrio, in Lombardy in northern Italy. It is raised throughout the Valtellina – from which its principal name derives – in the Val Malenco and the upper Val Masino in the Rhaetian Alps, and in the Valchiavenna. It may also be called the Frontalasca, for the village of Frontale, a frazione of the comune of Sondalo in the Val di Rezzalo, or the Rezzalasca for that valley. The name Frisa comes from its frisature, or Swiss markings.

== History ==
The Frisa Valtellinese shares common characteristics and origins with the Swiss Bündner Strahlenziege, or Grisons Striped, breed from the Swiss canton of the Grisons to the north-east, and with similar goats in the canton of Ticino immediately to the north of Sondrio. It also shows phenotypic similarity to the British Alpine breed, but does not share its history. The breed was officially recognised and a herd-book established in 1997.

The Frisa Valtellinese is one of the forty-three autochthonous Italian goat breeds of limited distribution for which a herdbook is kept by the Associazione Nazionale della Pastorizia, the Italian national association of sheep- and goat-breeders. At the end of 2013 the registered population was variously reported as 2810 and as 2432.

== Use ==
The milk yield per lactation of the Frisa Valtellinese is 271±115 litres for primiparous, 343±183 litres for secondiparous, and 369±180 litres for pluriparous, nannies. The milk averages 3.23% fat and 3.04% protein. The viulìn de càvra de Ciavéna, a goat's meat prosciutto, is made with the meat.

The breed shows promise for vegetation management for the purpose of fire prevention.
