= Sarda goat =

Italian breed of goat

Sarda
- Conservation status: FAO (2007): not at risk; DAD-IS (2026): at risk/vulnerable
- Country of origin: Italy
- Distribution: Sardinia
- Standard: MIPAAF
- Use: milk, also meat

Traits
- Weight: Male: 67 kg; Female: 50 kg
- Height: Male: 77 cm; Female: 70 cm
- Coat: very variable
- Horn status: may be horned
- Beard: may be bearded
- Tassels: may be present
- Goat; Capra aegagrus hircus

The Sarda is an Italian breed of domestic goat indigenous to the Mediterranean island of Sardinia, off the west coast of central Italy. It is raised throughout the island, particularly in the provinces of Cagliari and Nuoro. It is an ancient breed that has been influenced by the Maltese goat.

The Sarda is one of the eight autochthonous Italian goat breeds for which a genealogical herdbook is kept by the Associazione Nazionale della Pastorizia, the Italian national association of sheep- and goat-breeders. The herdbook was established in 1981. In 1998 the total population was 260000, of which 6577 were registered in the herdbook; at the end of 2013 the registered population was 11121.

== Characteristics ==
The animals are of medium build, long-necked and deep-chested; nannies have well-developed udders. The breed is particularly hardy and well-suited to being raised in a feral or semi-feral state in tough conditions. As much as possible of the available pasture is used by the Sarda sheep. Goats are marginalised and allowed only the poorest terrain; they are fed little or nothing over and above what they can graze.

== Use ==
The milk yield of the Sarda per lactation of 220–240 days is 173±62 litres for primiparous, 215±98 litres for secondiparous, and 237±109 litres for pluriparous, nannies. The milk contains an average of 3.94% milk protein, and is used to make milk products including: Gioddu, a fermented milk product; Casu Axeddu, a mixed pecorino–caprino cheese; and ricotta.

Kids are slaughtered at a weight of 7–10 kg.
