= Rossa Mediterranea =

Italian breed of goat

- Conservation status: FAO (2007): not at risk
- Other names: Derivata di Siria
- Country of origin: Italy
- Distribution: Sicily; Basilicata; Calabria
- Standard: MIPAAF
- Use: milk

Traits
- Weight: Male: 70 kg; Female: 48 kg
- Height: Male: 79 cm; Female: 72 cm
- Skin colour: brown
- Coat: red-brown
- Horn status: may be present in either sex
- Goat; Capra aegagrus hircus

The Rossa Mediterranea is an Italian breed of domestic goat from the Mediterranean island of Sicily, in southern Italy. It derives from the Damascus goat of Syria and the eastern Mediterranean, and is thus also known as the Derivata di Siria. It is raised mainly in Sicily, but also in Basilicata and Calabria in southern mainland Italy.

The Rossa Mediterranea is one of the forty-three autochthonous Italian goat breeds of limited distribution for which a herdbook is kept by the Associazione Nazionale della Pastorizia, the Italian national association of sheep- and goat-breeders. Total numbers for the breed were recently estimated at 56000. At the end of 2013 the registered population was reported as 3385.

== Use ==
The Rossa Mediterranea is a milk breed. Milk production per lactation for pluriparous nannies is approximately 570 kg, and may reach 750 kg. The milk has an average of 4.11% fat and 3.53% protein, and is used predominantly for cheese-making.
