= Rustica di Calabria =

Italian breed of goat

- Conservation status: FAO (2007): no data; DAD-IS (2025): not at risk
- Other names: Capra di Cosenza; Moscia Calabrese; Rustica Calabrese; Sciara
- Country of origin: Italy
- Distribution: Calabria
- Standard: MIPAAF
- Use: dual-purpose, milk and meat

Traits
- Weight: Male: 65–70 kg; Female: 45–50 kg
- Height: Male: 75–80 cm; Female: 60 cm
- Hair colour: variable
- Horn status: usually horned
- Goat; Capra aegagrus hircus

The Rustica di Calabria or Sciara is an Italian breed of domestic goat indigenous to Calabria in southern Italy. It is raised mostly in the provinces of Catanzaro and Cosenza, where it is present in substantial numbers. It may also be known as the Capra di Cosenza or the Moscia Calabrese.

== History ==
The Rustica di Calabria has been little studied, and its origins remain unclear. It may derive in part from other breeds including the Garganica and the Maltese, or others whose introduction to Calabria in the early twentieth century is documented, such as the Abyssinian or the type known as the "Tibetan".

It is one of the forty-three autochthonous Italian goat breeds of limited distribution for which a herd-book is kept by the Associazione Nazionale della Pastorizia, the Italian national association of sheep- and goat-breeders. At the end of 2013 the registered population was 24130, most of which were in the province of Cosenza; for 2023 a total number of 12387 head is reported – including 11155 registered breeding nannies and 694 active billies – in the hands of 106 breeders. In 2025 the conservation status of the breed was listed in DAD-IS as "not at risk".

== Characteristics ==
The Rustica di Calabria is highly variable. The coat may be of various shades of black, brown or white. Both sexes are horned and bearded. Body weights are in the range 65–70 kg for billies and 45–50 kg for nannies; heights at the shoulder are 75–80 cm and about 60 cm respectively.

Nannies give birth once a year; the twinning rate is approximately 50%.

== Use ==
The milk yield of pluriparous Rustica di Calabria nannies is 200–250 litres per lactation of 150 days. Kids are usually slaughtered at a weight of 6–7 kg.
