= Di Teramo =

Italian breed of goat

- Conservation status: FAO (2007): endangered
- Country of origin: Italy
- Distribution: province of Teramo
- Standard: MIPAAF
- Use: milk

Traits
- Weight: Male: 60–80 kg; Female: 45–60 kg
- Height: Male: 70–85 cm; Female: 60–70 cm
- Coat: variable, grey, black or brown
- Horn status: horned in both sexes
- Goat; Capra aegagrus hircus

The Di Teramo is an indigenous breed of domestic goat from the province of Teramo, in Abruzzo in southern Italy, and is raised only in that area. Numbers are very low; the breed was listed as endangered by the Food and Agriculture Organization of the United Nations in 2007. It is further threatened by cross-breeding with the Garganica breed.

The Di Teramo is one of the forty-three autochthonous Italian goat breeds of limited distribution for which a herdbook is kept by the Associazione Nazionale della Pastorizia, the Italian national association of sheep- and goat-breeders. Numbers were estimated at 500 in 1983; at the end of 2013 the registered population was 58.

== Use ==
The milk yield for pluriparous nannies is 250–400 kg per lactation of 180–240 days.
