= Sempione goat =

Breed of goat

Sempione
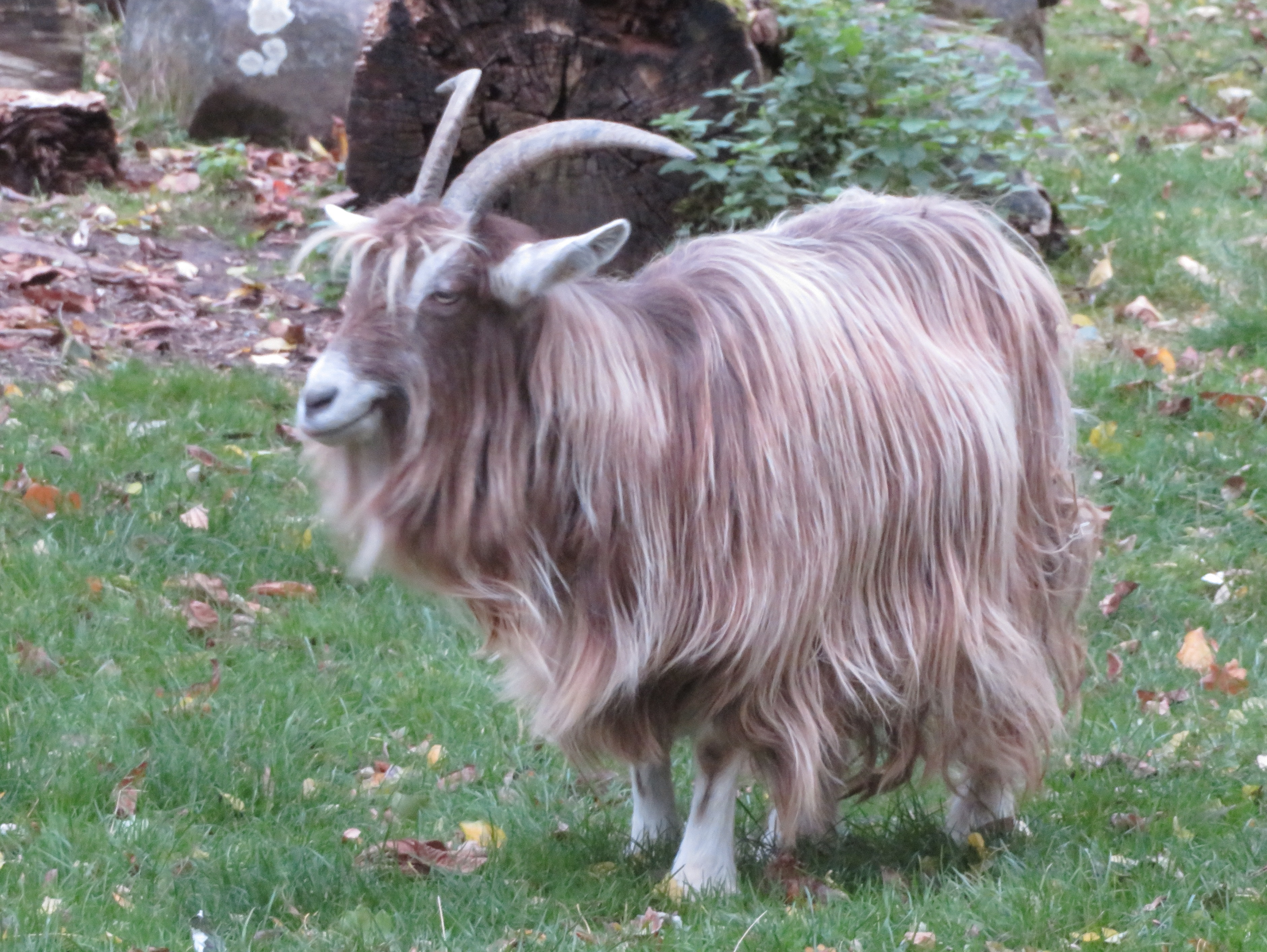
- Conservation status: FAO (2007): critical
- Other names: Simplonziege; Simplerziege
- Country of origin: Italy; Switzerland
- Distribution: Province of Verbano-Cusio-Ossola; Province of Vercelli
- Standard: MIPAAF
- Use: meat

Traits
- Weight: Male: 70 kg; Female: 60 kg
- Height: Male: 78 cm; Female: 72 cm
- Wool colour: white or cream
- Face colour: white
- Horn status: horned in both sexes
- Goat; Capra aegagrus hircus

The Sempione is a rare breed of domestic goat from the mountains of Piemonte in north-western Italy and the neighbouring area of Simplon in the canton of Valais in Switzerland; Sempione is the Italian name for Simplon. The Sempione goat is well documented in photographs from the early twentieth century, but is now thought to be close to extinction, and has more than once been considered extinct. Examples were recorded at Saliceto di Cravagliana in the province of Vercelli in 1983, and others have since been identified in the province of Verbano-Cusio-Ossola, particularly in the Val Divedro and the upper Ossola.

Its origins are not clear; it may be related to the Vallesana breed or to the Alpina Comune. Genetic studies to confirm or refute these hypotheses have not been carried out.

The breed is not recognised in Switzerland; the Swiss ProSpecieRara foundation registered all identifiable members of the breed in Switzerland and in Germany in 2013. In Italy the Sempione is one of the forty-three autochthonous Italian goat breeds of limited distribution for which a herdbook is kept by the Associazione Nazionale della Pastorizia, the national association of sheep- and goat-breeders. It was listed as critically endangered by the Food and Agriculture Organization of the United Nations in 2007. At the end of 2013 the registered population was variously reported as 4 and as 25.
