= Valdostana =

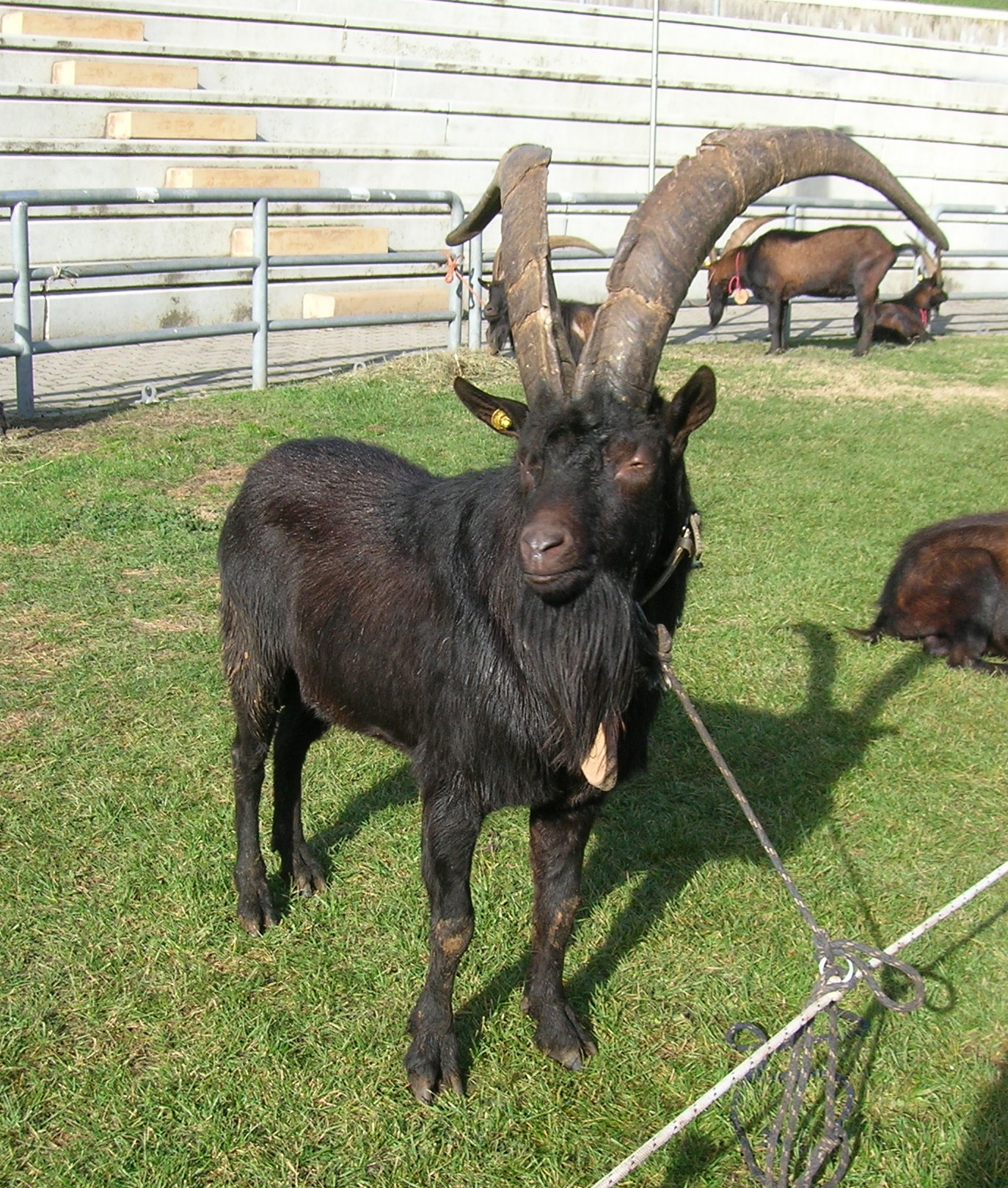
- Conservation status: FAO (2007): critical; DAD-IS (2022): critical
- Other names: Chamoisée valdôtaine
- Country of origin: Italy
- Distribution: Aosta Valley
- Standard: MIPAAF
- Use: meat; milk; combat

Traits
- Weight: Male: 85 kg; Female: 65 kg
- Height: Male: 80 cm; Female: 75 cm
- Wool colour: ashen; black; brown; dark grey with blond
- Horn status: large and sabre-shaped in both sexes
- Goat; Capra aegagrus hircus

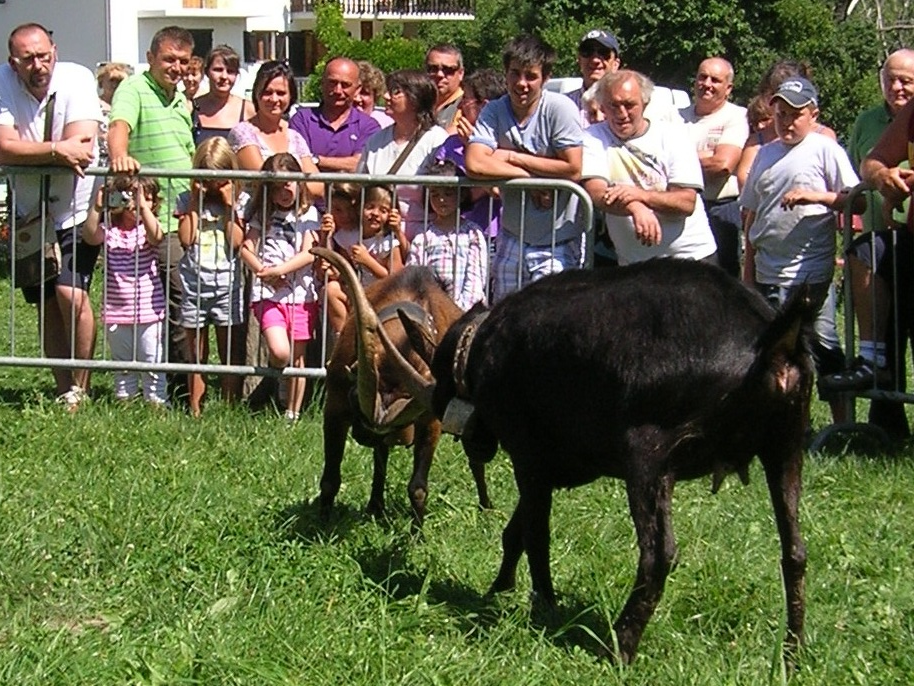
The bataille des chèvres at Challand-Saint-Anselme

The Valdostana (It.) or Chamoisée valdôtaine (Fr.) is an Italian breed of domestic goat from the autonomous region of Aosta Valley in north-western Italy, from which it takes its name. It is characterised by large sabre-shaped horns, which it uses in combat in the traditional local sport of goat-fighting.

It is an endangered breed: its conservation status is listed in DAD-IS as 'critical'.

== History ==
The Valdostana is a traditional regional breed of the autonomous region of Aosta Valley in north-western Italy, from which it takes its name. The earliest written documentation of it dates from 1917. It is reared particularly in the Ayas Valley and in the Lys Valley (in Aosta Valley), and also in the Chiusella Valley, the Orco Valley and the Susa Valley and in the upper Canavese (in Piedmont). It was in the past distributed in the Graian Alps and Pennine Alps.

It is one of the forty-three autochthonous Italian goat breeds of limited distribution for which a herd-book is kept by the Associazione Nazionale della Pastorizia, the Italian national association of sheep- and goat-breeders.

It is a rare breed: in 2007 its conservation status was listed by the FAO as 'critical'. At the end of 2013 the registered population was variously reported as 959 and as 856; in the 2020 the total number reported to DAD-IS was 71.

== Characteristics ==
The Valdostana is a rustic solidly-built goat of Alpine type, well suited to the mountainous terrain of the region. There is considerable variation in the colour of the coat, which may be ashen, black, brown, or dark grey with some blond hair. The horns in both sexes are sabre-shaped and large; this may be partly the result of selective breeding by farmers to improve the fighting ability of the animals.

== Use ==
The Valdostana is kept both for meat, which is consumed both fresh and preserved in the form of goat salame and of Motsetta; and for milk, which is used for cheese-making. A study in 2002 found the average milk yield to be 249 kg in 197 days.

It is much used in the traditional sport of goat-fighting, the bataille des chèvres. Since 1998 this sport has been regulated by the association Comité régional des batailles de chèvres, which organises an annual regional championship.
