= Lariana =

Breed of goat

- Conservation status: FAO (2007): not at risk
- Other names: Capra di Livo
- Country of origin: Italy
- Distribution: Province of Como
- Standard: MIPAAF
- Use: mainly meat

Traits
- Weight: Male: 60 kg; Female: 45–50 kg
- Height: Female: 72 cm
- Coat: very variable
- Horn status: horned or hornless
- Goat; Capra aegagrus hircus

The Lariana or Capra di Livo is an indigenous breed of domestic goat from the province of Como, in Lombardy in northern Italy. It is raised in the Livo valley and throughout the western Lario; the two names of the breed derive from these places. It is of Alpine type and has highly variable characteristics. Management is extensive: the animals are kept on alpine pasture from May to December, and brought under cover for the winter months.

The Lariana is one of the forty-three autochthonous Italian goat breeds of limited distribution for which a herdbook is kept by the Associazione Nazionale della Pastorizia, the Italian national association of sheep- and goat-breeders. At the end of 2013 the registered population was variously reported as 2777 and as 3091. A breed named Val di Livo, from the same area and with the same characteristics, is also separately reported to DAD-IS; it was listed by the Food and Agriculture Organization of the United Nations in 2007 as extinct.
