= Grigia Molisana =

Italian breed of goat

- Conservation status: FAO (2007): endangered
- Other names: Campobasso; Capra di Campobasso; Capra di Montefalcone
- Country of origin: Italy
- Distribution: Molise
- Standard: MIPAAF
- Use: dual-purpose, milk and meat

Traits
- Weight: Male: 60–64 kg; Female: 50–55 kg
- Height: Male: 80–85 cm; Female: 70–75 cm
- Skin colour: usually dark
- Coat: variable
- Horn status: usually horned
- Goat; Capra aegagrus hircus

The Grigia Molisana is an Italian breed of greyish domestic goat indigenous to Molise in southern Italy. It is raised in the comuni of Acquaviva Collecroci, Castelmauro, Montefalcone nel Sannio, Montemitro and San Felice del Molise; all are in the province of Campobasso, and the breed may also be called the Capra di Campobasso. The highest concentration is in Montefalcone, from which the name Capra di Montefalcone derives. The origins of the breed are not known; studies conducted in the 1980s suggest influence from the Alpino Comune, Garganica and Maltese breeds.

The Grigia Molisana is one of the forty-three autochthonous Italian goat breeds of limited distribution for which a herdbook is kept by the Associazione Nazionale della Pastorizia, the Italian national association of sheep- and goat-breeders. At the end of 2013 the registered population was 443, all of which were in the province of Campobasso.

== Use ==
The milk yield of the Grigia Molisana is 300–320 litres in 150 days. The milk has 4.1% fat, 3.0% protein and 4.8% lactose. It is used to make Caprino di Montefalcone del Sannio goat's-milk cheese, which is listed in the Ark of Taste, and Formaggio di Pietracatella and Pecorino di Capracotta, which have PAT status.

Kids weigh 3 kg at birth, and average 11–12 kg at 60 days. Misischia, a salume of sun-dried goat's meat, is also produced.
