= Ciavenasca goat =

Italian breed of goat

Ciavenasca
- Conservation status: FAO (2007): not listed
- Country of origin: Italy
- Distribution: Valchiavenna, Province of Sondrio
- Standard: none (not recognised)
- Use: mainly meat

Traits
- Height: Male: 76 cm; Female: 75 cm
- Coat: very variable
- Horn status: horned or hornless
- Goat; Capra aegagrus hircus

The Ciavenasca is an Italian breed of domestic goat from the Valchiavenna, in the northern part of the province of Sondrio, in Lombardy in northern Italy. It is raised only in that area; the name of the breed derives from that of the valley or the town of Chiavenna. The Ciavenasca belongs to the group of polychrome or multi-coloured Alpine goat breeds and displays several distinct coat types, each of which has a name in the local dialect. Management is extensive: the animals are kept on high alpine pasture in the summer months. They are extremely hardy and well adapted to mountain terrain.

The Ciavenasca is not officially recognised as a breed. It is not among the forty-three autochthonous Italian goat breeds of limited distribution for which a herdbook is kept by the Associazione Nazionale della Pastorizia, the Italian national association of sheep- and goat-breeders, nor is it reported to the DAD-IS database of the Food and Agriculture Organization of the United Nations. In 2002, it was reportedly in the process of being recognised. The population was estimated at 3000 at that time.

== Use ==
The Ciavenasca is a dairy breed, but is kept mainly for meat, both from kids and from mature animals. Local food specialities derived from it include the viulìn de càvra de Ciavéna (Italian: violino di capra della Valchiavenna), a goat's meat prosciutto or spalla; there is also a salume called filùn, made in a similar way from the backbone and back muscles of the animal, salted and seasoned in well-ventilated natural caves. The milk is used to make Mascarpin cheese, which may be smoked or peppered.
