= Valais Blackneck =

Swiss breed of goat

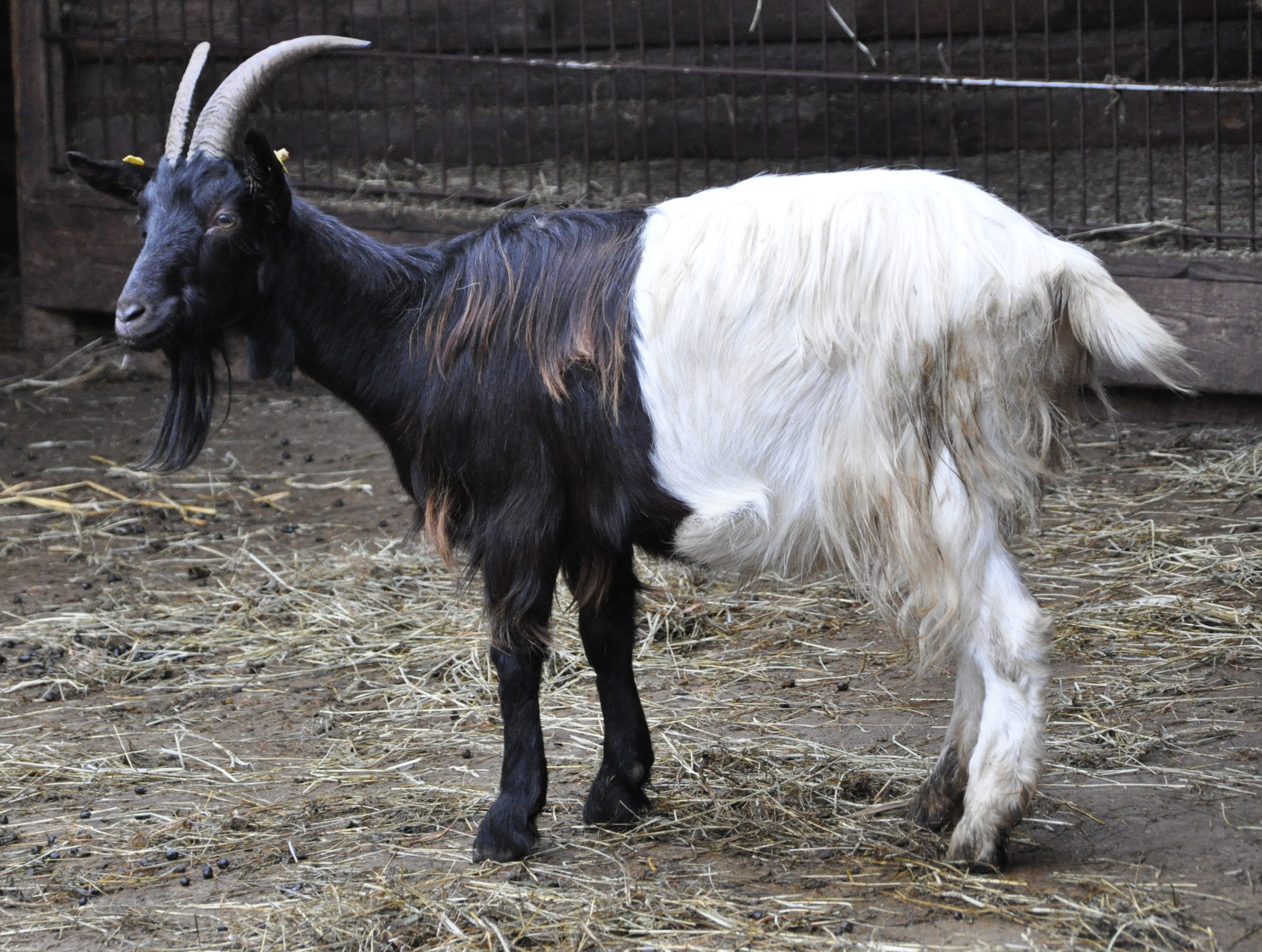
- Valais Blackneck (Capra aegagrus hircus) in the Lüneburg Heath wildlife park, Germany.

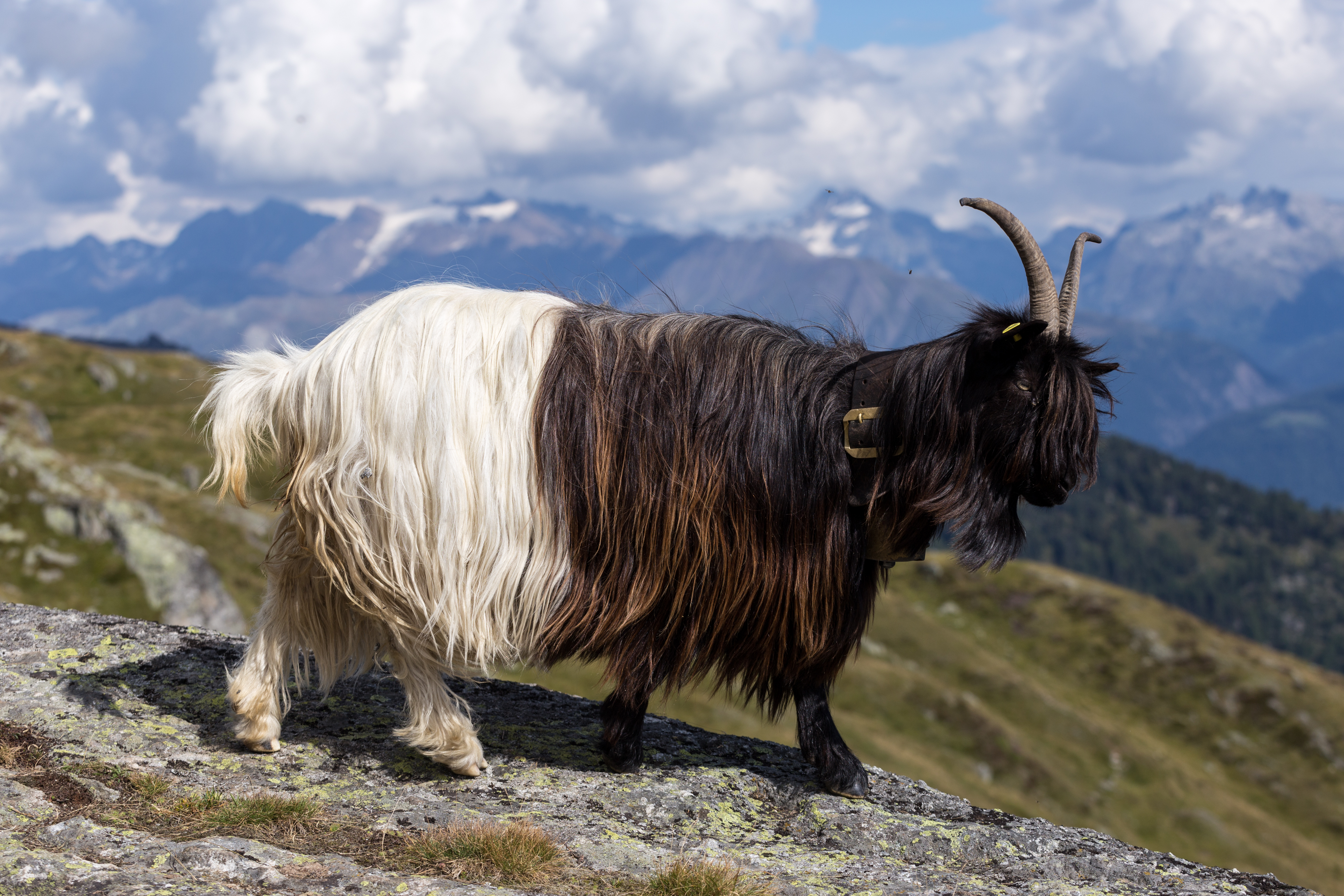
- Adult Valais Blackneck Goat on Belalp, Canton of Valais, Switzerland
- Conservation status: FAO (2007): Europe: not at risk; Italy: critical; Switzerland: endangered-maintained; DAD-IS (2025): Austria: at risk/critical; Germany: at risk/critical; Italy: at risk/critical; Switzerland: at risk/endangered-maintained
- Other names: Walliser Schwarzhalsziege; Gletschergeiss; Col Noir du Valais; Chèvre des Glaciers; Race de Viège; Vallesana; Vallese
- Country of origin: Switzerland; Austria; Germany; Italy; Netherlands
- Distribution: mainly in the Valais
- Standard: OZIV (Switzerland, in German); SZZV (Switzerland, in German); MIPAAF (Italy, in Italian)
- Use: meat; milk; vegetation management

Traits
- Weight: Male: minimum 75 kg; Female: minimum 55 kg
- Height: Male: 85 cm; Female: 75 cm
- Skin colour: often pale
- Coat: black foreparts, white hindparts
- Hair colour: black, white
- Face colour: black
- Horn status: horned in both sexes
- Goat; Capra aegagrus hircus

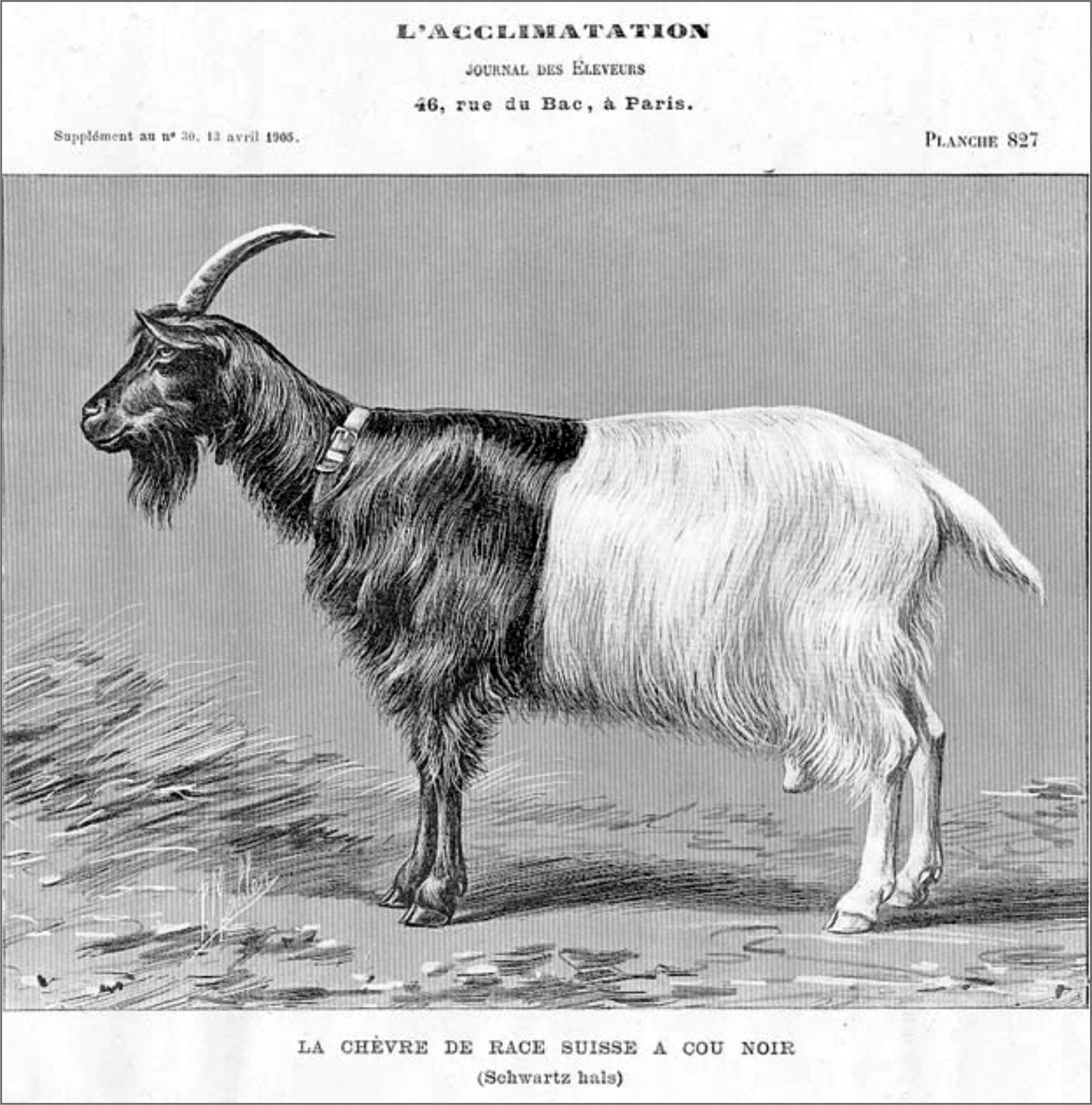
Engraving of a Valais Blackneck from the Journal des Eleveurs, 1905

The Valais Blackneck is a Swiss breed of domestic goat from the canton of Valais. It has a distinctive colouring, black from the nose to behind the shoulder and white from there to the tail.

It is distributed in southern Switzerland – the largest concentration is in the area of Visp (Viège) – and in neighbouring areas of northern Italy; it is present in modest numbers in Austria and Germany. It is known by many names, including German: Walliser Schwarzhalsziege or Gletschergeiss; French: Col Noir du Valais, Chèvre des Glaciers or Race de Viège; and Italian: Vallesana or Vallese.

== History ==
The Walliser Schwarzhalsziege is a traditional breed of the Swiss canton of Valais. A herd-book was established in 1920.

Within Italy, the Vallesana is raised in the provinces of Verbania and Vercelli. It is one of the forty-three autochthonous Italian goat breeds of limited distribution for which a herd-book is kept by the Associazione Nazionale della Pastorizia, the Italian national association of sheep- and goat-breeders.

At the end of 2013 the total numbers for the breed were 3000–3400 in Switzerland and either 191 or 446 in Italy. In 2012 Austria reported 100–300 head and Germany 429.

== Characteristics ==
The Valais Blackneck is of medium size; nannies stand on average 75 cm at the withers, with a body weight of at least 55 kg, billies are on average about 10 cm taller and weigh no less than 75 kg. The colouring of the coat is distinctive: coal black from the nose to behind the shoulder and snow white from there to the tail; the division between the two colours is clearly defined, and should be within ±3 cm of the point where the last rib meets the spine. The fore hooves are black, the hind ones pale. The coat hair is long and the skin is fine; horns are present in both sexes, as is a black beard; the horns are larger in billies.

The English Bagot is similarly coloured, and has been thought to derive from this breed by descent from one presented to Richard II of England in 1387; DNA studies have shown that the Bagot originated in Spain.

== Use ==
The Valais Blackneck is reared principally for its meat; it is not usually milked. The milk yield is approximately 500 kg per lactation. The pelts may be used to make leather goods.

The goats are also used for vegetation management: they move freely on steep mountain terrain, which they help to keep clear of excess scrub vegetation.
