= Girgentana =

Italian breed of goat

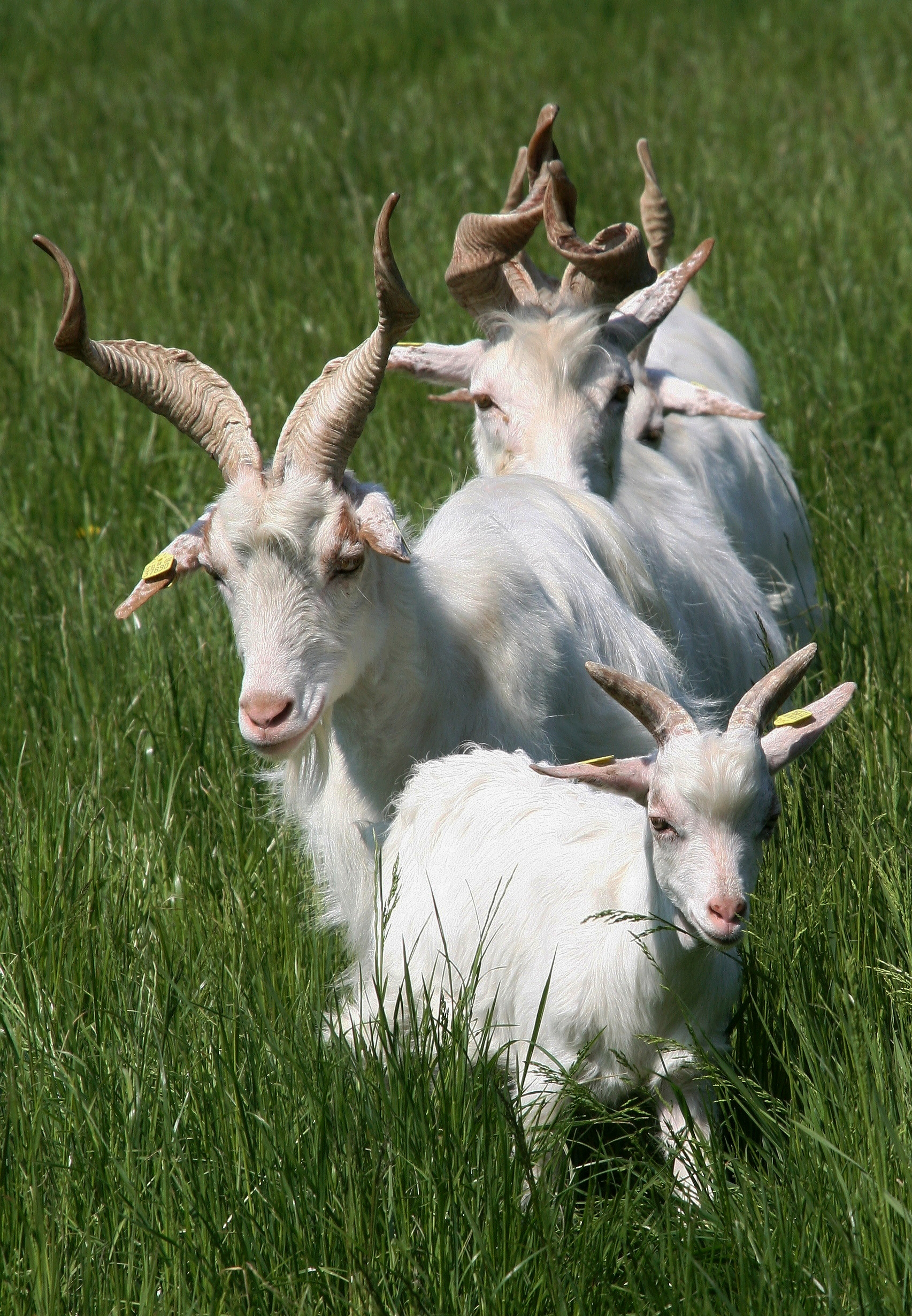
- Conservation status: FAO (2007): endangered
- Other names: Nturcina
- Country of origin: Italy
- Distribution: Sicily; mainland Italy; western Europe
- Use: milk, also kid meat

Traits
- Weight: Male: 65 kg; Female: 46 kg
- Height: Male: 85 cm; Female: 80 cm
- Hair colour: white
- Face colour: white, sometimes yellowish, occasionally grey
- Horn status: tall spiral horns in both sexes
- Beard: present in both sexes
- Goat; Capra aegagrus hircus

The Girgentana or Nturcina is an Italian breed of domestic goat indigenous to the province of Agrigento, in the southern part of the Mediterranean island of Sicily. The name of the breed derives from Girgenti, the name of Agrigento in local Sicilian language. There were in the past more than 30000 head in the hills and coastal zone of the province. In the twenty-first century the breed is in danger of disappearance.

== History ==
The Girgentana was first described by Arturo Magliano in 1930; the origins of the breed are unknown. The animals could have been introduced to Sicily by Greek colonists about 700 BC, or in the eighth century AD by Arab invaders. Johann Wolfgang Amschler identified the Girgentana with Capra prisca and the Ram in a Thicket statues excavated at Ur by Leonard Woolley in 1927–28. Leopold Adametz proposed that it is descended, at least in part, from the markhor, Capra falconeri, a species of Central Asian goat-antelope; the horns are superficially similar, but spiral in opposite directions – the right horn of the Girgentana spirals clockwise from the base (like a corkscrew), while in the markhor it is the left.

The Girgentana is one of the eight autochthonous Italian goat breeds for which a genealogical herdbook is kept by the Associazione Nazionale della Pastorizia, the Italian national association of sheep-breeders. It was formerly numerous in the province of Agrigento, where there were more than 30000 in the coastal area and the hilly hinterland. It has since fallen rapidly, to the point that measures for its protection may be needed. At the end of 1993 the population was estimated at 524. The conservation status of the breed was listed as "endangered" by the Food and Agriculture Organization of the United Nations in 2007. At the end of 2013 the registered population was 390.

== Characteristics ==
The goats are of medium size: nannies stand some 80 cm at the withers and have an average weight of 46 kg, while billies are on average about 5 cm taller and weigh approximately 65 kg. The head is small and delicate, with a convex profile and erect ears; beards are present in both sexes. The horns are large and of twisted spiral form, almost joined at the base and rising almost vertically. The coat is white, sometimes tinged on the face with yellow or – more rarely – with grey.

== Use ==
The Girgentana is reared principally for milk. Yields are of the order of 400–450 kg in a lactation of 150–180 days.

Lambs are slaughtered at between 30 and 60 days old, when they weigh from 7 to 10 kg.
