= Simplon =

Simplon is the name of a region in the Alps, and can refer to:

- Simplon Pass, high mountain pass between the Pennine Alps and Lepontine Alps in Switzerland
- Simplon Tunnel, close to the pass
- Simplon Valley, a valley between the Pennine and Lepontine Alps and between Switzerland and Italy.
- Simplon, Valais, a Swiss municipality
- Simplon (département), a former French département corresponding with modern Valais, Switzerland
- Simplon (Paris Metro), a stop on the Paris Metro
- Simplon, a farm and railway station in Namibia (see de:Simplon (Namibia))
