= Alpina Comune =

Breed of goat

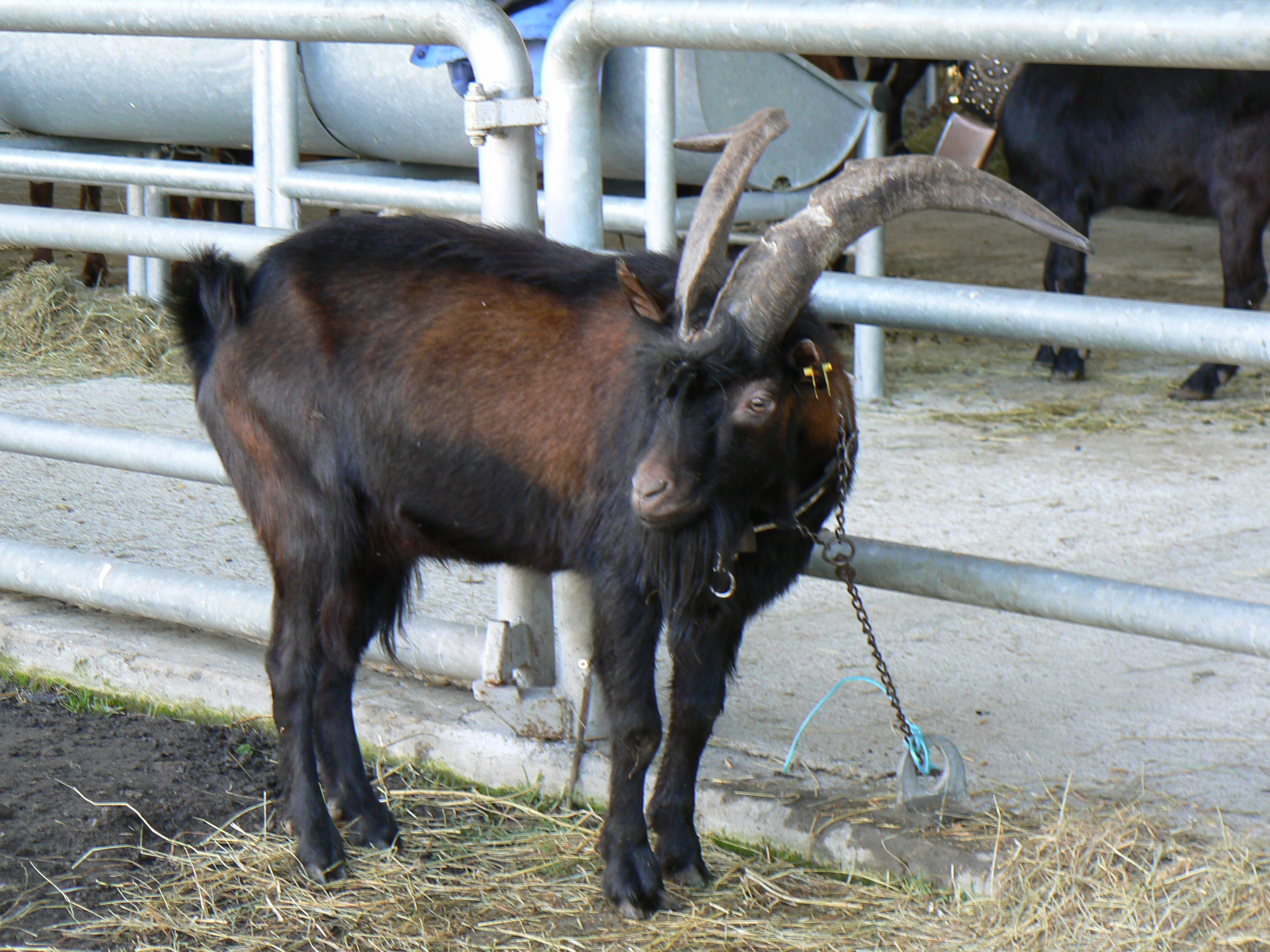
- Conservation status: FAO (2007): not listed
- Other names: Alpina; Alpina Locale; Nostrana
- Country of origin: Italy
- Distribution: Lombardy; Piemonte
- Standard: MIPAAF
- Use: varied

Traits
- Weight: Male: 60–65 kg; Female: 50–55 kg
- Height: Male: 75–80 cm; Female: 65–70 cm
- Coat: very variable, polychrome
- Horn status: horned or hornless
- Beard: usually bearded
- Goat; Capra aegagrus hircus

The Alpina Comune is a heterogeneous population of domestic goats widely distributed in the Alps of northern Italy, particularly in the regions of Lombardy and Piemonte. It is highly variable in size, in morphological characteristics such as the type, colour and pattern of its coat and the shape and carriage of its ears, and in type of use. It does not display any of the uniformity characteristic of a breed, other than a consistent hardiness and adaptation to mountain terrain. It is however officially recognised and protected as one. The name Alpina Comune, "common", is more used in Piemonte; in Lombardy it may be called Alpina Locale, "local", or simply Nostrana, "ours".

== Distribution and numbers ==
The Alpina Comune is raised throughout Piemonte, from the mountains of the province of Cuneo to those of the province of Verbano-Cusio-Ossola, and in a large area of the Lombard Alps including the Brianza, the Canton of Ticino, the Grisons, the Lario, the Alpi Orobie, the Val Camonica, the Valchiavenna and the Valtellina. Management is extensive: the animals are kept on medium or high alpine pasture in the summer months.

The Alpina Comune is classed as one of the forty-three autochthonous Italian goat breeds of limited distribution; a herdbook is kept by the Associazione Nazionale della Pastorizia, the Italian national association of sheep- and goat-breeders. At the end of 2013 the registered population was variously reported as 497, almost all of which were in Val d'Aosta, and as 510. Figures for the total size of the population vary widely. It was estimated at 22,000 in 1973, and in 2001 at 55,000. Another estimate in 2002 reached the same figure, with 40,000 in Piemonte and 15,000 in Lombardy, while a population of 100,000 was estimated both in 2005 and in 2008.

== Use ==
The Alpina Comune is raised both for meat and for milk. The milk yield is approximately 400–600 kg per lactation of 180–270 days. The milk is used to make cheeses, either pure caprino or mixed-milk, including Toma, Raschera, Bra and robiola. Kids are usually slaughtered at a weight of 10–13 kg; the meat of adult animals is used to make salumi such the violino, a goat's-meat prosciutto. The products vary from place to place depending on the local traditions of the area.
