= Toggenburger =

Swiss breed of goat

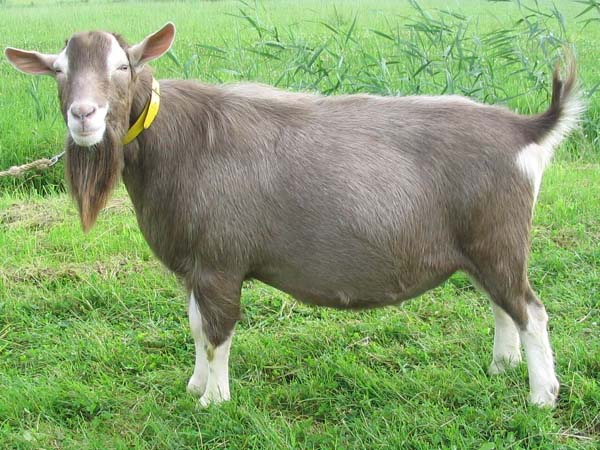
- Conservation status: FAO (2007): not at risk; DAD-IS (2024): not at risk
- Other names: Toggenburg; Toggenburger Ziege; Toggenburgerziege; Chèvre du Toggenbourg; Capra del Toggenburgo
- Country of origin: Switzerland
- Distribution: worldwide
- Standard: Schweizerischer Ziegenzuchtverband
- Use: milk

Traits
- Weight: Male: 75 kg; Female: 55 kg
- Height: Male: 85 cm; Female: 75 cm
- Horn status: horned or hornless
- Tassels: with or without tassels
- Goat; Capra aegagrus hircus

The Toggenburger or Toggenburg is a Swiss breed of dairy goat. Its name derives from that of the Toggenburg region of the Canton of St. Gallen, where it is thought to have originated. It is among the most productive breeds of dairy goat and is distributed world-wide, in about fifty countries in all five inhabited continents.

== History ==
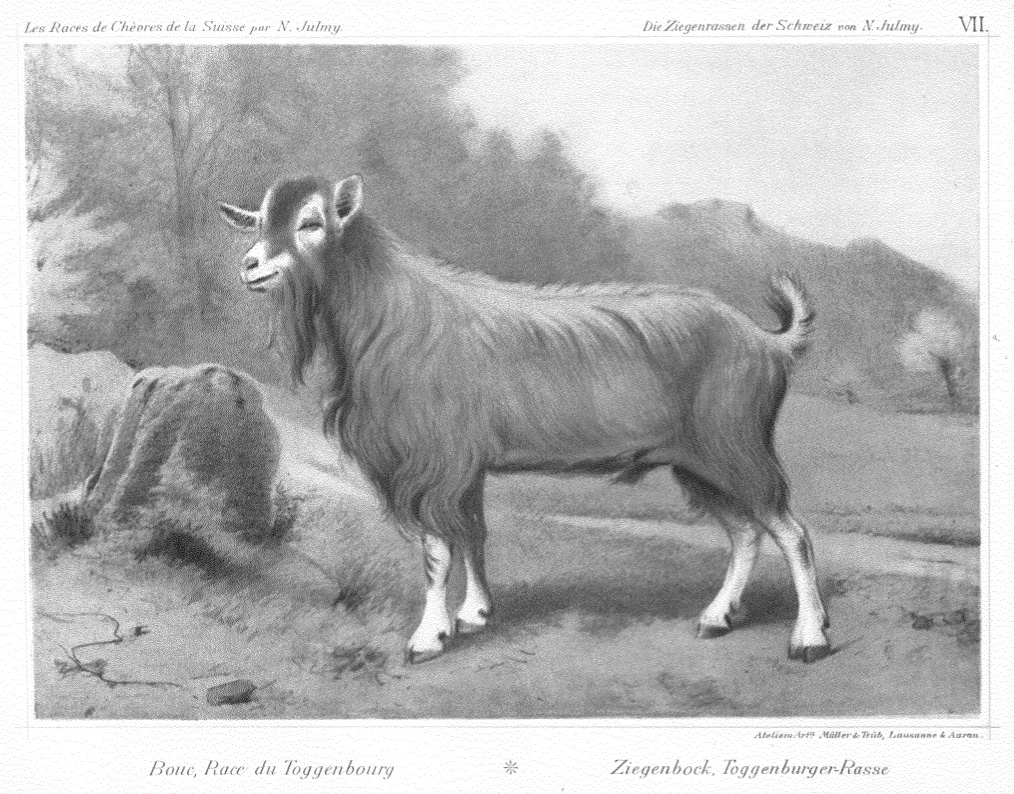
Plate from Les Races de Chevres de la Suisse by Nicolas Julmy, 1896

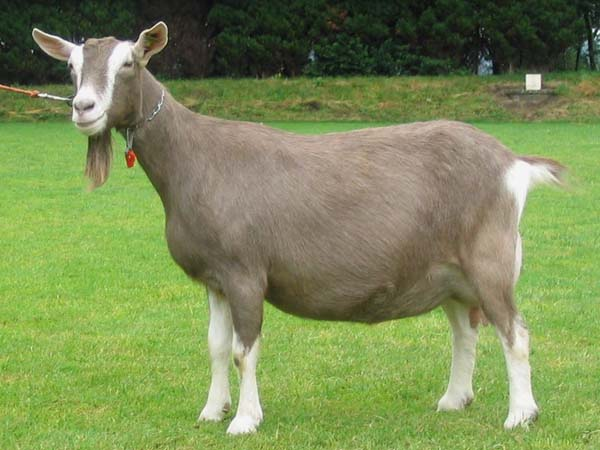
Female

The Toggenburger is the traditional goat breed of the Toggenburg and Werdenberg regions of the Canton of St. Gallen in eastern Switzerland. The herd-book was started in 1890. At first, the goats were often dark-coated, sometimes with white markings; there may have been some cross-breeding with Appenzell and Chamois-coloured stock in neighbouring areas. The typical mouse-grey colour with white facial markings was fixed by selective breeding in the twentieth century.

The herd-book is kept by the Schweizerischer Ziegenzuchtverband, the national association of goat-breeders; a breed society, the St. Galler Ziegenzuchtverband, has origins going back to 1901. In 2006 there were 850 of the goats in the Toggenburg and the Werdenberg regions, out of a total of 3000 in Switzerland; this is much lower than in the 1950s, when there were more than 20000. In 2023 the total population in the country was estimated to be in the range 3235–7273, with just over 3000 breeding females and 196 active males registered in the herd-book. While the breed is not at risk world-wide, its local conservation status within Switzerland is "at risk/vulnerable".

The Toggenburger is distributed world-wide, in about fifty countries in all five inhabited continents, among them most countries of Europe and of Central America, the West Indies and South America. Herd-books have been established in Austria, Australia, Belgium, Canada, South Africa and the United States (where the first imports were in 1904); in Holland and the United Kingdom distinct national breeds have developed. The British Toggenburg was recognised as a breed in 1921; it is somewhat larger and heavier than the original Swiss goat, and has a higher milk yield.

== Characteristics ==
The Toggenburger is of medium size. Coat colour ranges from light brown to mouse grey, with white Swiss markings to the face, lower legs and tail area. Tassels may be present; billies and nannies may be naturally horned or polled (hornless).

== Use ==
It is a highly productive dairy breed. The breed standard calls for minimum milk yield of 740 kg per lactation, with a minimum fat content of 3.56% and minimum protein content of 2.90%.
