= Swiss Marked =

Goat

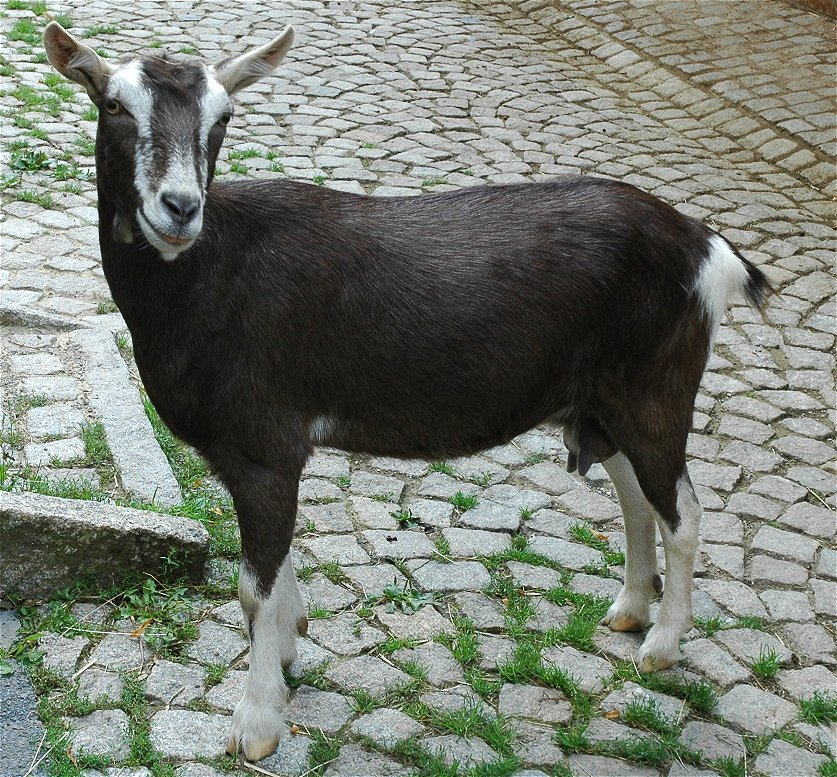
A Thuringian goat with Swiss Markings. Note that this goat has undiluted black areas and diluted near-white tan areas.

Goats expressing the Swiss Marked pattern have a black (eumelanin pigment) body and belly and tan (phaeomelanin pigment) legs, ears, and facial stripes. The allele which codes for this pattern is located at the agouti locus of the goat genome. There are multiple modifier genes which control how much tan pigment is actually expressed and so the tan areas can range from pure white to deep red. There may also be present dilution genes which turn the black areas in the pattern to either chocolate or medium brown.

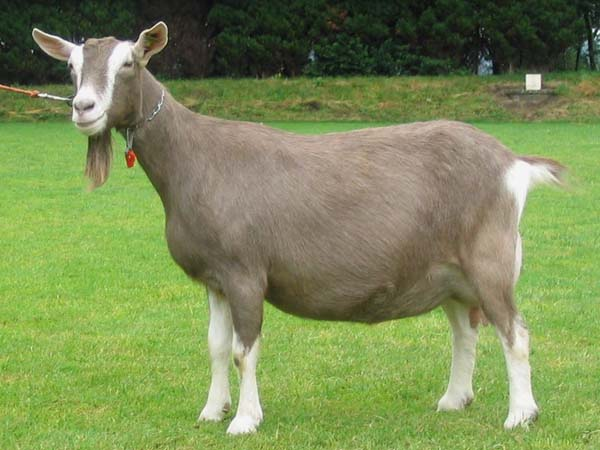
A Toggenburg goat with Swiss Markings. Note that these Toggenburgs have modifier genes which turn the black-pigmented areas to medium brown and the tan areas to white.

== See also ==
- Leucism
- Point coloration
