= Caprino cheese =

Italian goat cheese

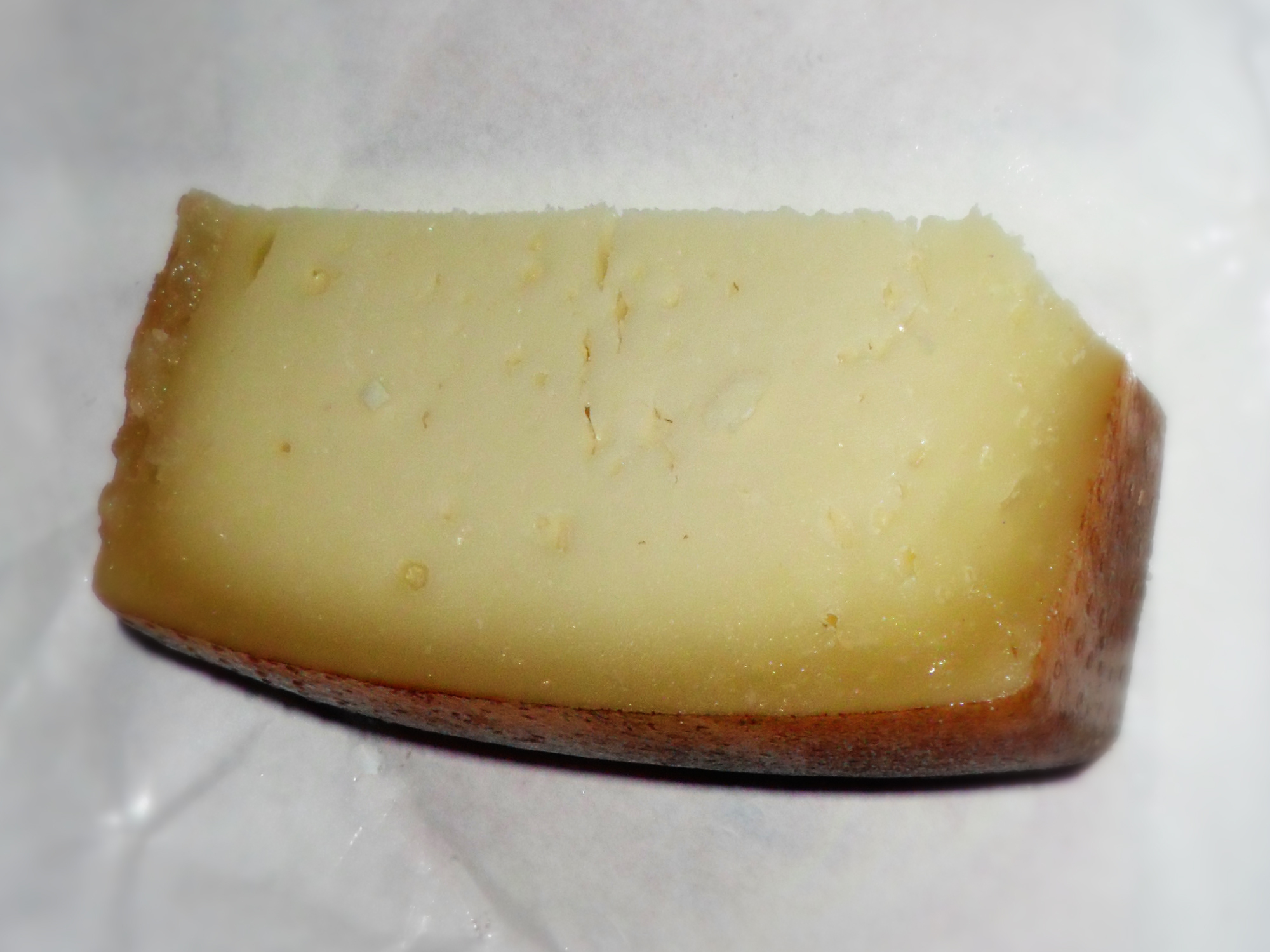
Aged caprino

Caprino is an Italian cheese traditionally made from whole or skimmed goat's milk. The name of the cheese derives from the Italian word for goat, capra. With modern methods of production, the cheese is made from cow's milk as well or a combination of both cow's and goat's milks. The two major styles of caprino are fresco ("fresh") and stagionato ("aged").

== Production ==
The cheese begins production by adding a whey-based starter culture to whole or part-skim raw milk. The milk is then heated to promote coagulation that takes place within 24 hours. Once the coagulation occurs, the curd is removed to a mold without milling. The molds sit for a period of 24 hours for the whey to drain out completely. The cheese is then salted and turned a number of times and then allowed to age depending on product desired. Versions include those aged for 30 days or longer, and those seasoned with parsley, garlic, chives, and ground pepper.

== Caprino fresco ("fresh caprino") ==
A fresh version of caprino, caprino fresco, is aged for three to four days and has a soft, creamy texture, and a round or cylindrical shape. It is often sold wrapped in paper or immersed in olive oil, especially when shipped for preservation.

== Caprino stagionato ("aged caprino") ==
Caprino stagionato is often aged 20–40 days or longer depending on the region, which gives the cheese a saltier and tangy flavor. The shape is small and square or marshmallow-shaped. The rind is often thin and yellow or reddish in color.

== Variations ==
- Caprino di Rimella is usually made entirely of raw goat's milk, but sometimes with cow's milk with the curd produced with cow or lamb rennet which is heated to 18–20 °C (64–68 °F), after the milk has soured. The curd is then shaped by hand and drained on hemp cloth for three days. The cheese is then dry-salted and ready for eating. It is usually brownish-white in color, and produced in the Piedmont in Valsesia and the municipality of Rimella.
- Caprino Ossolano is made entirely of raw goat's milk; this cheese was not produced for years but is now included in the Ark of Taste catalogue of heritage foods. It is produced from March to October. After the milk has soured and has been heated to 18 °C (64 °F), rennet from kid (young goat) or lamb is added to create a curd. The curd is then placed in a mold and dry-salted while the whey is drained out. The cheese is aged for three days. It has a soft, firm texture and is cream-white in color. The rind often has a straw-yellow color. The cheese is specifically produced in Piedmont in Domodossola, Varzo, and Val Vigezzo.
- Caprino di Cavalese is made from goat's milk produced in the Cavalese valley; this cheese was once produced throughout Val di Fiemme. The milk is heated to 31 °C (88 °F) after which calf or lamb rennet is added to begin curd production. The resulting soft curd is cut into small pieces which are again heated to 44 °C (111 °F). The curd is then placed in a mold and dry-salted until it can no longer absorb salt. The result is then aged in an earth- or stone-floored cellar. During the aging process, the cheese is turned once a week and is washed with a brine solution. The resulting cheese has a thin rind which is reddish-yellow in color and the cheese inside is ivory-white. It is produced in Trentino in the area of Cavalese and Fiavé Pinzolo.
- Caprino della Valbrevenna is produced from September to October from goat's milk. Milk enzymes are added to the milk for souring and then it is heated to 20–25 °C (68–77 °F) after which some producers add a bit of whey from earlier productions. After a few hours, calf rennet is added to form a curd which takes about 12–16 hours. The curd is then cut into large pieces and placed into molds. A large amount of whey is expelled from this version, so as whey is released, more curd is often used to top off molds. It is usually produced as a fresh cheese, but can be aged sometimes for up to 30 days. In its fresh state it has no rind but develops a yellowish rind when aged. The cheese is soft and milk-white. It is produced in Liguria in the municipalities of Triora, Molini di Triora, and Cosio di Arroscia in the province of Imperia, and Ormea in the province of Cuneo.
- Caprino dell'Aspromonte is made from goat's milk that has kid rennet added to it and then heated to 36–37 °C (97–99 °F). Once the curd forms, it is cut with a special knife, a ruotolo, into pieces the size of a piece of rice. The resulting curd is strained and then placed into rush baskets and pressed by hand, and it is allowed to set for a few hours after which it is dry-salted and then allowed to mature on a rush rack (cannizzo). It is aged for a time to create either a soft table cheese or longer to create a mature hard cheese with a grey-brown rind and an ivory-white to brownish color to the cheese inside. It is produced in Calabria in the Aspromonte area of the province of Reggio Calabria.
- Caprino della Limina is made from goat's milk with kid rennet added to it; then, it's left to set for one hour. Once the curd forms, it is stirred with a wooden spoon to break it up. The curd is then placed in rush baskets and pressed to remove excess whey. The cheese is removed from the mold and salted and placed back into the mold for a day, and then removed and aged in a cellar. The rind is brushed with olive oil as it ages up to 12 months. The rind is straw-yellow in color and has soft milk-white flesh that hardens as it ages past the third to fourth month. It is produced in Calabria in municipalities found in mountain communities in Limina.
- Caprino di Montefalcone del Sannio is made from raw goat's milk cheese during April to September. Kid rennet is added to the milk which is then heated to 38 °C (100 °F) for 30 minutes. The resulting curd is cut into small pieces which then settle and are reheated to 42 °C (108 °F). Once the curd solidifies, it is placed into rush baskets and pressed, which is then placed into hot whey from ricotta production. The cheese is then dry-salted for 24 hours after which it's aged for at least two months in a cellar where they are hung from the ceiling in wooden holders called cascere. The resulting cheese has a wrinkled straw-yellow rind with a soft, moist, chalk-white flesh. It is produced throughout Abruzzo and Molise, but particularly in the municipality of Montefalcone del Sannio.

== See also ==
- List of Italian cheeses
- List of goat milk cheeses
