= Extensive farming =

Agriculture system that involve low inputs and outputs relative to land area

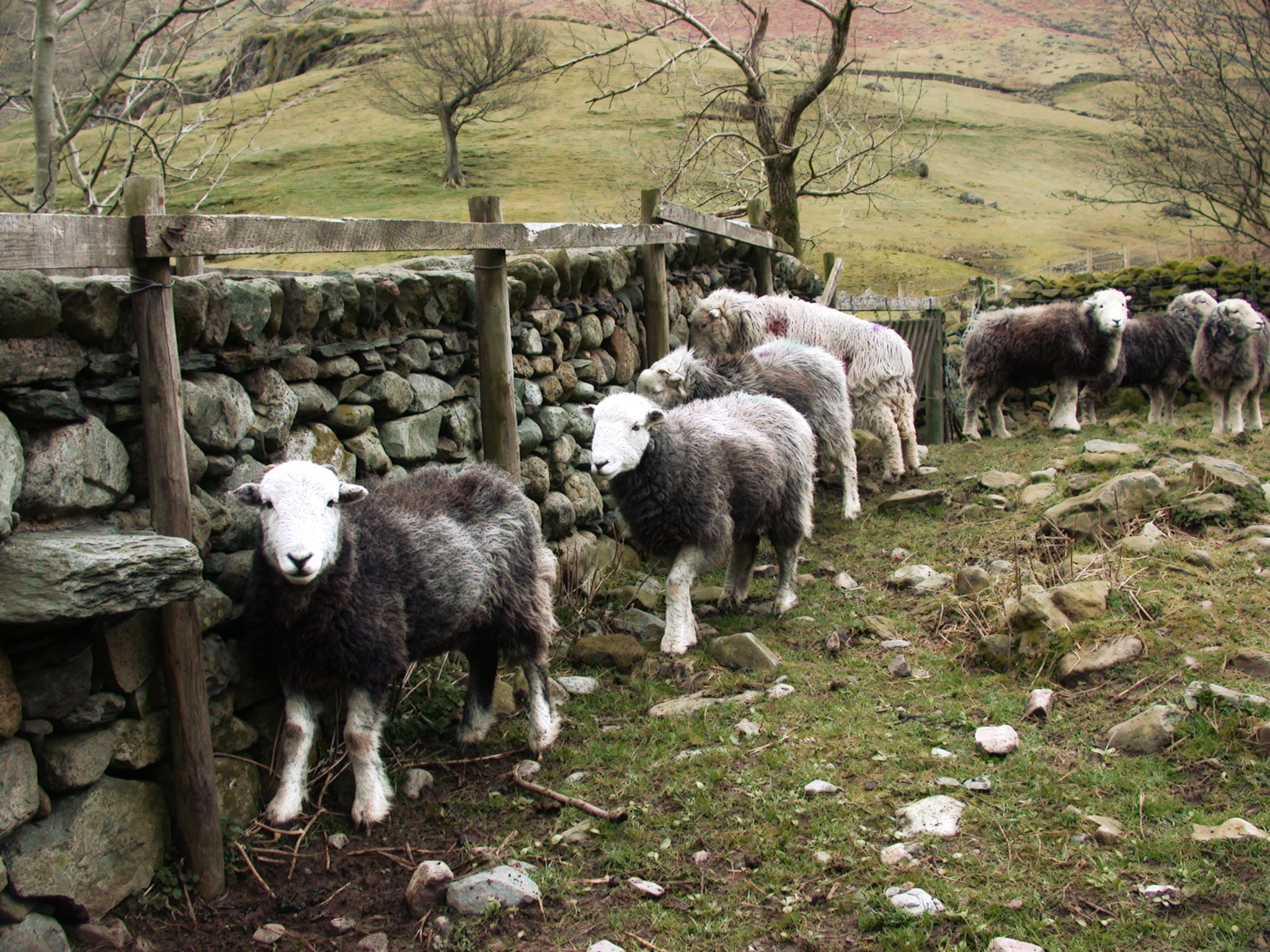
Herdwick sheep in an extensive hill farming system, Lake District, England. The sheep are free to climb to the unfenced upland area.

Extensive farming or extensive agriculture (as opposed to intensive farming) is an agricultural production system that uses small inputs of labor, fertilizers, and capital, relative to the land area being farmed.

== Systems ==
Continuous grazing by sheep or cattle is a widespread extensive farming system, with low inputs and outputs.

Extensive farming most commonly means raising sheep and cattle in areas with low agricultural productivity, but includes large-scale growing of wheat, barley, cooking oils and other grain crops in areas like the Murray-Darling Basin in Australia. Here, owing to the extreme age and poverty of the soils, yields per hectare are very low, but the flat terrain and very large farm sizes mean yields per unit of labor are high. Nomadic herding is an extreme example of extensive farming, where herders move their animals to use feed from occasional rainfalls.

== Geography ==
Extensive farming is found in the mid-latitude sections of most continents, as well as in desert regions where water for cropping is not available. The nature of extensive farming means it requires less rainfall than intensive farming. The farm is usually large in comparison with the numbers working and money spent on it. In 1957, most parts of Western Australia had pastures so poor that only one sheep to the square mile could be supported.

Just as the demand has led to the basic division of cropping and pastoral activities, these areas can also be subdivided depending on the region's rainfall, vegetation type and agricultural activity within the area and the many other parentheses related to this data.

== Advantages and disadvantages ==
=== Advantages ===
Extensive farming has a number of advantages over intensive farming:

1. Less labour per unit areas is required to farm large areas, especially since expensive alterations to land (like terracing) are completely absent.
2. Mechanisation can be used more effectively over large, flat areas.
3. Greater efficiency of labour means generally lower product prices.
4. Animal welfare is generally improved because animals are not kept in stifling conditions.
5. Lower requirements of inputs such as fertilizers.
6. If animals are grazed on grassland native to the locality, there is less likely to be problems with exotic species.
7. The meat of the livestock will taste better and appeal to customers.
8. Local environment and soil are not damaged by overuse of chemicals.
9. The ecological impact is lower.
10. Animals bred in larger areas develop more efficiently.

=== Disadvantages ===
Extensive farming can have the following problems:

1. Yields tend to be much lower than with intensive farming in the short term.
2. Large land requirements limit the habitat of wild species (in some cases, even very low stocking rates can be dangerous), as is the case with intensive farming.
3. Less profitable than intensive farming per unit of area.

Extensive farming was once thought to produce more methane and nitrous oxide per kg of milk than intensive farming. One study estimated that the "carbon footprint" per billion kg (2.2 billion lb.) of milk produced in 2007 was 37 percent that of equivalent milk production in 1944. However, a more recent study by Centre de coopération internationale en recherche agronomique pour le développement found that extensive livestock systems impact the environment less than intensive systems.

== See also ==
- Dehesa in Spain, or montado in Portugal, with cork oak and Black Iberian pig.
- Herding
- Pastoralism
- Polyculture
- Ranching
- Slash-and-burn agriculture
- Taungya in Myanmar
- Transhumance
