= Gravidity and parity =

Number of times a female has given birth to a baby

In biology and medicine, gravidity and parity are the number of times a female has been pregnant (gravidity) and carried the pregnancies to a viable gestational age (parity). These two terms are usually coupled, sometimes with additional terms, to indicate more details of the female's obstetric history. When using these terms:

- Gravida indicates the number of times a female is or has been pregnant, regardless of the pregnancy outcome. An active pregnancy, if any, is included in this count. A multiple pregnancy (e.g., twins, triplets, etc.) is counted as 1.
- Parity, or "para", indicates the number of births (including live births and stillbirths) where pregnancies reached viable gestational age. A multiple pregnancy (e.g., twins, triplets, etc.) carried to viable gestational age is still counted as 1.
- Abortus is the number of pregnancies that were lost before viable gestational age for any reason, including induced abortions or miscarriages but not stillbirths. The abortus term is sometimes dropped when no pregnancies have been lost.

== Gravidity in biology ==
In biology, the term gravid (Latin: gravidus "burdened, heavy") is used to describe the condition of an animal (most commonly fish or reptiles) when carrying eggs internally. For example, Astatotilapia burtoni females can transform between reproductive states, one of which is gravid, and the other non-gravid. In entomology it describes a mated female insect.

== Gravidity in human medicine ==
In human medicine, "gravidity" refers to the number of times a person has been pregnant, regardless of whether the pregnancies were interrupted or resulted in a live birth. “Gravidity” is an important component of a patient’s reproductive history, as it provides insight into the risk factors that the patient has for pregnancy outcomes, such as risk for gestational diabetes, pre-eclampsia, spontaneous abortion, preterm birth, fetal growth restriction, and more. The gravidity of the patient is associated with risk for other conditions as well, including risk for breast, ovarian, and endometrial cancer. Knowing a patient’s obstetric history in a prenatal assessment or early in gestation allows the patient to receive early intervention to prevent these associated risks.

- The term "gravida" refers to a pregnant person.
- A "nulligravida" is a person who has never been pregnant.
- A "primigravida" is a person who is pregnant for the first time or has been pregnant once.
- A "multigravida" or "secundigravida" is a person who has been pregnant more than once.

Terms such as "gravida 0", referring to a nulligravida, "gravida 1" for a primigravida, and so on, can also be used. The term "elderly primigravida" has also been used to refer to a person in their first pregnancy who is at least 35 years old. Advanced maternal age can be a risk factor for some birth defects.

== Parity in medicine ==
In human medicine, parity is the number of pregnancies carried by a female for at least 20 weeks (duration varies from region to region, 20 – 28 weeks, depending upon age of viability). If a female carries the fetus to a viable age, even if ultimately the fetus is born deceased, this still counts as an instance of parity, as parity is based on the time of gestation before a birth, and not the status of the offspring once born.

A female who has never carried a pregnancy beyond 20 weeks is nulliparous and is called a nullipara or para 0. A female who has given birth once is primiparous and is referred to as a primipara or primip. A female who has given birth two, three, or four times is multiparous and is called a multip. Grand multipara describes the condition of having given birth five or more times. Grand multiparity is associated with adverse maternal and neonatal health outcomes.

Like gravidity, parity may also be counted. A female who has given birth one or more times can also be referred to as para 1, para 2, para 3, and so on.

Viable gestational age varies from region to region.

=== Nulliparity ===
A nulliparous (/nʌlˈɪpərəs/) female (a nullipara or para 0) has never given birth. It includes females who have experienced spontaneous miscarriages and induced abortions before the mid-point of pregnancy, but not females who have experienced pregnancy loss after 20 weeks. Nulliparity has been implicated in the development of various complications during pregnancy, including preeclampsia, gestational diabetes, and pre-term labor.

Long-term and permanent nulliparity (/ˌnʌlɪˈpærɪti/) are risk factors for breast cancer. For instance, a meta-analysis, published in 1990, of eight population-based studies in the Nordic countries found that never giving birth was associated with a 30% increase in the risk of breast cancer compared with females who have given birth, and for every two births, the risk was reduced by about 16%. Females having their first birth after the age of 35 years had a 40% increased risk compared to those with a first birth before the age of 20 years.

== Parity in biology ==
In agriculture, parity in biology is a factor in productivity in domestic animals kept for milk production. Animals that have given birth once are described as "primiparous"; those that have given birth more than once are described as "pluriparous". Those that have given birth twice may also be described as "secondiparous", in which case "pluriparous" is applied to those that have given birth three times or more.

== Recording systems ==
Several systems are incorporated into a female's obstetric history to record the number of past pregnancies and pregnancies carried to a viable age. These include:

- The gravida/para/abortus (GPA) system, or sometimes just gravida/para (GP), is one such shorthand. For example, the obstetric history of a female who has had two pregnancies (both of which resulted in live births) would be noted as G_{2}P_{2}. The obstetric history of a female who has had four pregnancies, one of which was a miscarriage before 20 weeks, would be noted in the GPA system as G_{4}P_{3}A_{1} and in the GP system as G_{4}P_{3}.
- TPAL is one of the methods to provide a quick overview of a person's obstetric history. In TPAL, the T refers to term births (after 37 weeks' gestation), the P refers to premature births, the A refers to abortions, and the L refers to living children. When reported, the "abortions" number refers to the total number of spontaneous or induced abortions and miscarriages, including ectopic pregnancies, before 20 weeks. If a fetus is aborted after 20 weeks, spontaneously or electively, then it is counted as a premature birth, and P will increase, but L will not. The TPAL is described by numbers separated by hyphens. Multiple births (twins, triplets, and higher multiples) count as one pregnancy (gravidity) and as one birth. For example, a pregnant female who carried one pregnancy to term with a surviving infant, carried one pregnancy to 35 weeks with surviving twins, carried one pregnancy to 9 weeks as an ectopic (tubal) pregnancy, and has three living children would have a TPAL annotation of T1, P2, A1, L3. This could also be written as 1-2-1-3.
- The term GTPAL is used when the TPAL is prefixed with gravidity, and GTPALM when GTPAL is followed by a number of multiple pregnancies. For example, the gravidity and parity of a female who has given birth at term once and has had one miscarriage at 12 weeks would be recorded as G2 T1 P0 A1 L1. This notation is not standardized and can lead to misinterpretations.

Though similar, GPA should not be confused with the TPAL system, the latter of which may be used to provide information about the number of miscarriages, preterm births, and live births by dropping the "A" from "GPA" and including four separate numbers after the "P", as in G_{5}P_{3114}. This TPAL form indicates five pregnancies, with three term births, one preterm birth, one induced abortion or miscarriage, and four living children.

Some established journals have used the GTPAL system, ignoring "T", and even rearranging the letters within the remaining combination [this effectively reduces it to the GPLA system. For instance G3P1L1A1]. Thus, individual choices of authors also seem to matter, which recognized journals often ignore.

== Criticism ==
In obstetrics, the term can lead to some ambiguity for events occurring between 20 and 24 weeks, and for multiple pregnancies.
