= Goat milk =

Liquid food produced by female goats

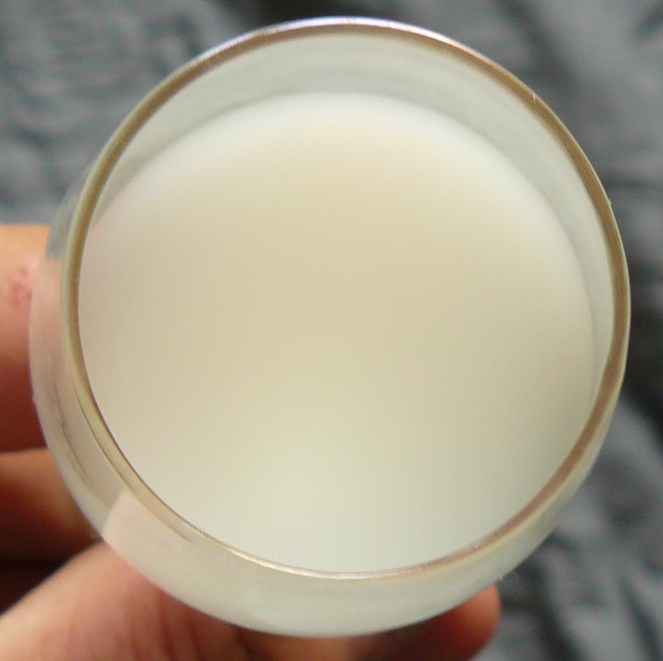
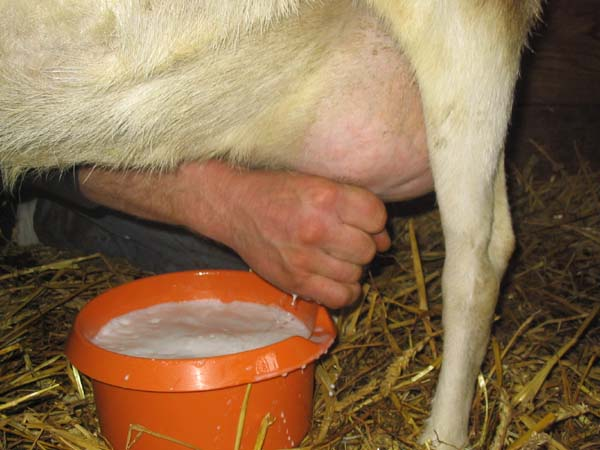

Goat milk is the milk of domestic goats. Goats produce about 2% of the world's total annual milk supply. Some goats are bred specifically for milk. Goat milk naturally has small, well-emulsified fat globules, which means the cream remains in suspension for a longer period of time than cow's milk; therefore, it does not need to be homogenized. Eventually, the cream rises to the top over a period of a few days. If the milk is to be used to make cheese, homogenization is not recommended as this changes the structure of the milk, affecting the culture's ability to coagulate the milk as well as the final quality and yield of the cheese.

Dairy goats in their prime (generally around the third or fourth lactation cycle) average—2.7 to 3.6 kg (6 to 8 lb)—(or 2.8 to 3.8 L (3 to 4 U.S. qt))—of milk production daily—roughly during a ten-month lactation. Goats produce more after freshening and gradually drop production toward the end of their lactation. The milk generally averages 3.5% butterfat.

== Cheese ==
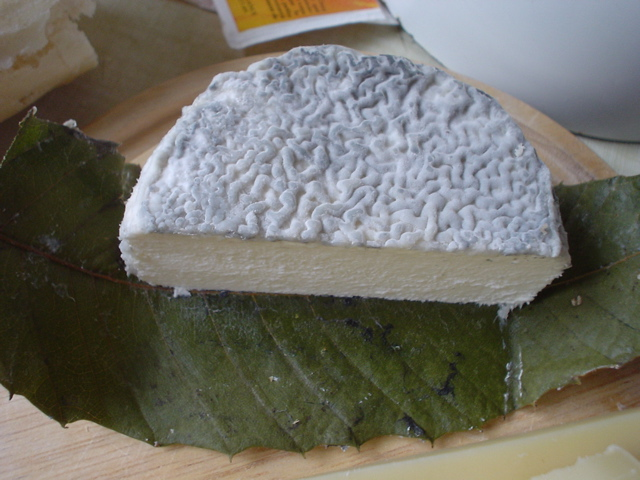
Pélardon is a type of cheese made from goat milk.

Goat milk is commonly processed into cheese, butter, ice cream, yogurt, cajeta and other products.

Goat cheese is known as fromage de chèvre ('goat cheese') in France. Some varieties include Rocamadour and Montrachet. Goat butter is white because goats produce milk with the yellow beta-carotene converted to a colorless form of vitamin A. Goat milk has less cholesterol.

== Nutrition ==
A 1970 book on animal husbandry claimed that goat's milk differs from cow’s or human milk in that it has greater digestibility, a different alkalinity, greater buffering capacity, and certain therapeutic values in human medicine and nutrition. George Mateljan suggested that goat’s milk could replace cow’s or sheep’s milk in the diet of those allergic to the milk of certain mammals. However, like cow’s milk, goat’s milk contains lactose (sugar) and can cause gastrointestinal problems for people with lactose intolerance. In fact, the lactose level is similar to that of cow milk.

Some researchers and companies producing goat dairy products have claimed that goat milk is better for human health than most Western cow's milk because it largely lacks a form of β-casein proteins called A1, and instead contains mostly the A2 form, which is not metabolized to β-casomorphin 7 in the body.

Basic composition of various milks (mean values per 100 g)
Constituent	Doe (goat)	Cow	Human
Fat (g)	3.8	3.6	4.0
Protein (g)	3.5	3.3	1.2
Lactose (g)	4.1	4.6	6.9
Ash (g)	0.8	0.7	0.2
Total solids (g)	12.2	12.3	12.3
Calories	70	69	68

A research project at the Department of Physiology of the University of Granada used rats with nutritionally induced iron-deficiency anemia. The research revealed that goat's milk contains properties that help prevent iron-deficiency anemia and bone demineralization. Furthermore, goats’ milk promotes the digestive and metabolic utilization of minerals such as iron, calcium, phosphorus, and magnesium.

Milk composition analysis, per 100 grams
Constituents	unit	Cow	Doe (goat)	Ewe (sheep)	Water buffalo
Water	g	87.8	88.9	83.0	81.1
Protein	g	3.2	3.1	5.4	4.5
Fat	g	3.9	3.5	6.0	8.0
Carbohydrates	g	4.8	4.4	5.1	4.9
Energy	kcal	66	60	95	110
Energy	kJ	275	253	396	463
Sugars (lactose)	g	4.8	4.4	5.1	4.9
Cholesterol	mg	14	10	11	8
Calcium	IU	120	100	170	195
Saturated fatty acids	g	2.4	2.3	3.8	4.2
Monounsaturated fatty acids	g	1.1	0.8	1.5	1.7
Polyunsaturated fatty acids	g	0.1	0.1	0.3	0.2

These compositions vary by breed (especially in the Nigerian Dwarf breed), animal, and point in the lactation period.

=== Considerations for infants ===
Like whole cow's milk, whole goat's milk is not recommended for use by infants due to the discrepancy between the composition of whole milk and breastmilk and the imperfection of the child's digestive organs for digesting evolutionarily unsuitable food. Lack of folic acid when using whole milk instead of breastfeeding in children leads to the development of B12 folate deficiency anemia. In the event of an allergic reaction in children to cow's milk, contrary to popular belief, the likelihood of developing it to goat's milk is equally high.

Like unmodified cow's milk, the American Academy of Pediatrics (AAP) discourages feeding infants unmodified goat's milk. An April 2010 case report describes an infant fed raw goat milk and summarizes AAP's recommendation and presents "a comprehensive review of the consequences associated with this dangerous practice." They also voiced, "Many infants are exclusively fed unmodified goat's milk as a result of cultural beliefs as well as exposure to false online information. Anecdotal reports have described a host of morbidities associated with that practice, including severe electrolyte abnormalities, metabolic acidosis, megaloblastic anemia, allergic reactions including life-threatening anaphylactic shock, hemolytic–uremic syndrome, and infections." Untreated caprine brucellosis results in a 2% case fatality rate. According to the USDA, doe milk is not recommended for human infants because it contains "inadequate quantities of iron, folate, vitamins C and D, thiamine, niacin, vitamin B_{6}, and pantothenic acid. Doe milk would not meet an infant's nutritional needs" and may cause harm to an infant's kidneys and could cause metabolic damage.

According to the Canadian federal health department Health Canada, most of the dangers of, and counter-indications for, feeding unmodified goat's milk to infants parallel those associated with unmodified cow's milk — especially insofar as allergic reactions go.

=== Infant formula ===
Breast milk is the best nutrition for infants. If this is not an option, infant formula is the alternative. EFSA (European Food Safety Association) concluded in 2012 that goat milk protein is suitable as a protein source in infant and follow-on formulas. Ever since, goat milk-based infant formulas have rapidly gained popularity around the world including: the UK, Australia, Germany, Netherlands, China, Korea, Australia and New Zealand. These formulas are not produced by the infant formula multinationals but by companies that focus on specialty infant formulas. In the U.S. goat milk infant formula is not yet available.

The American Academy of Pediatrics (AAP) recognizes that goat infant formula has been thoroughly reviewed and supports normal growth and development in infants.

== Gallery ==
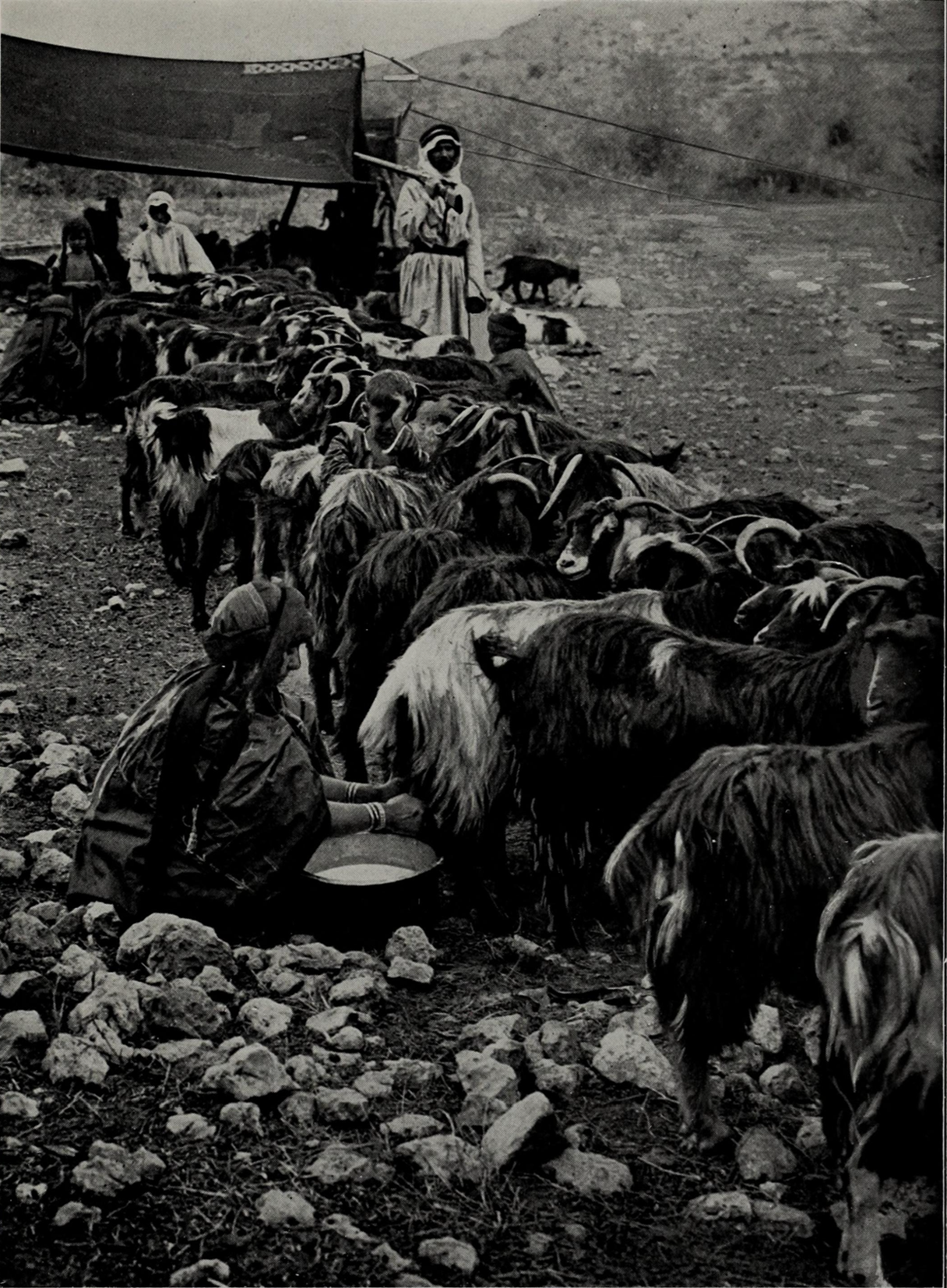
Milking goats in the Levant region, early 20th century

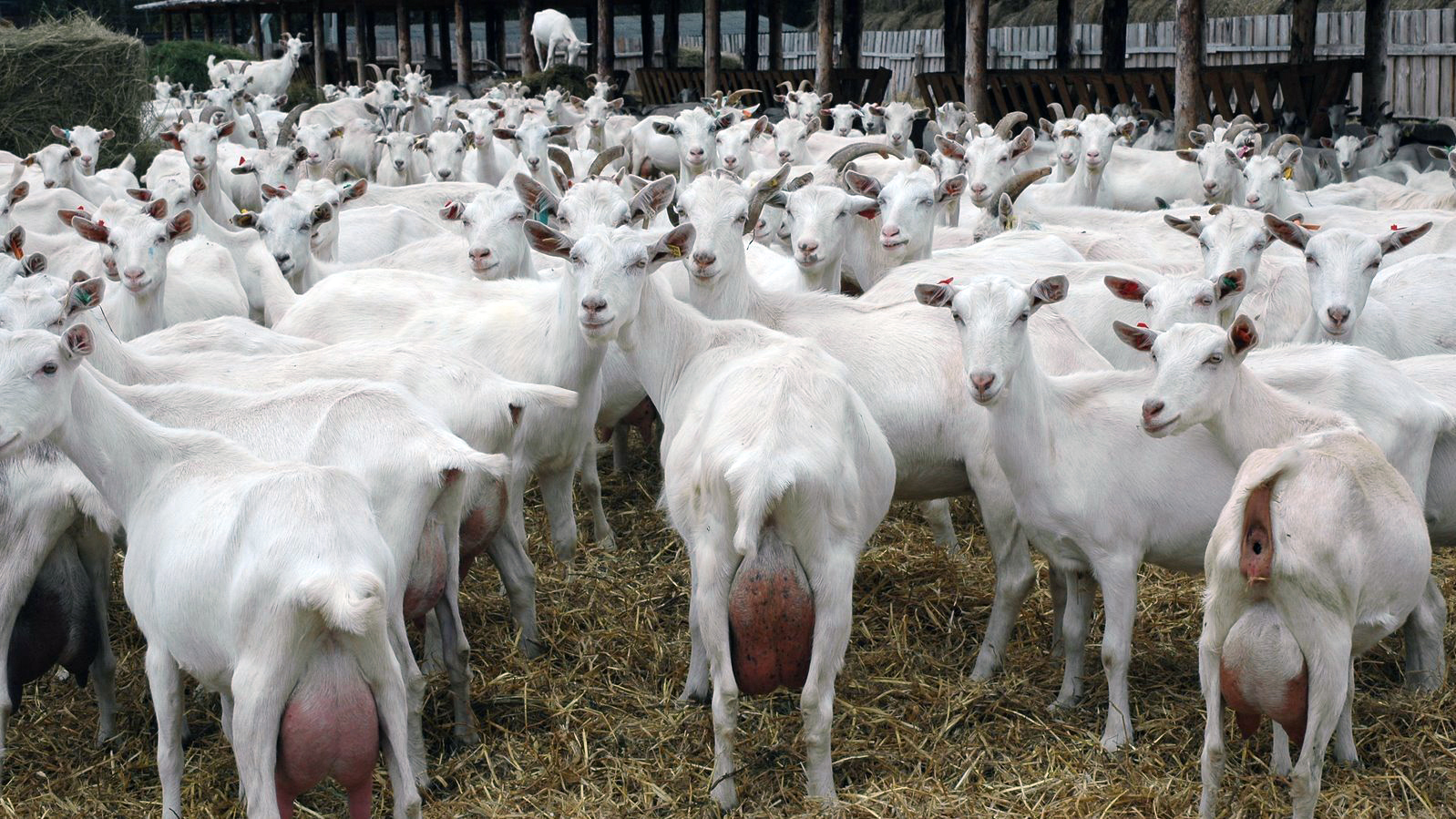
Dairy goat breed "Saanen"

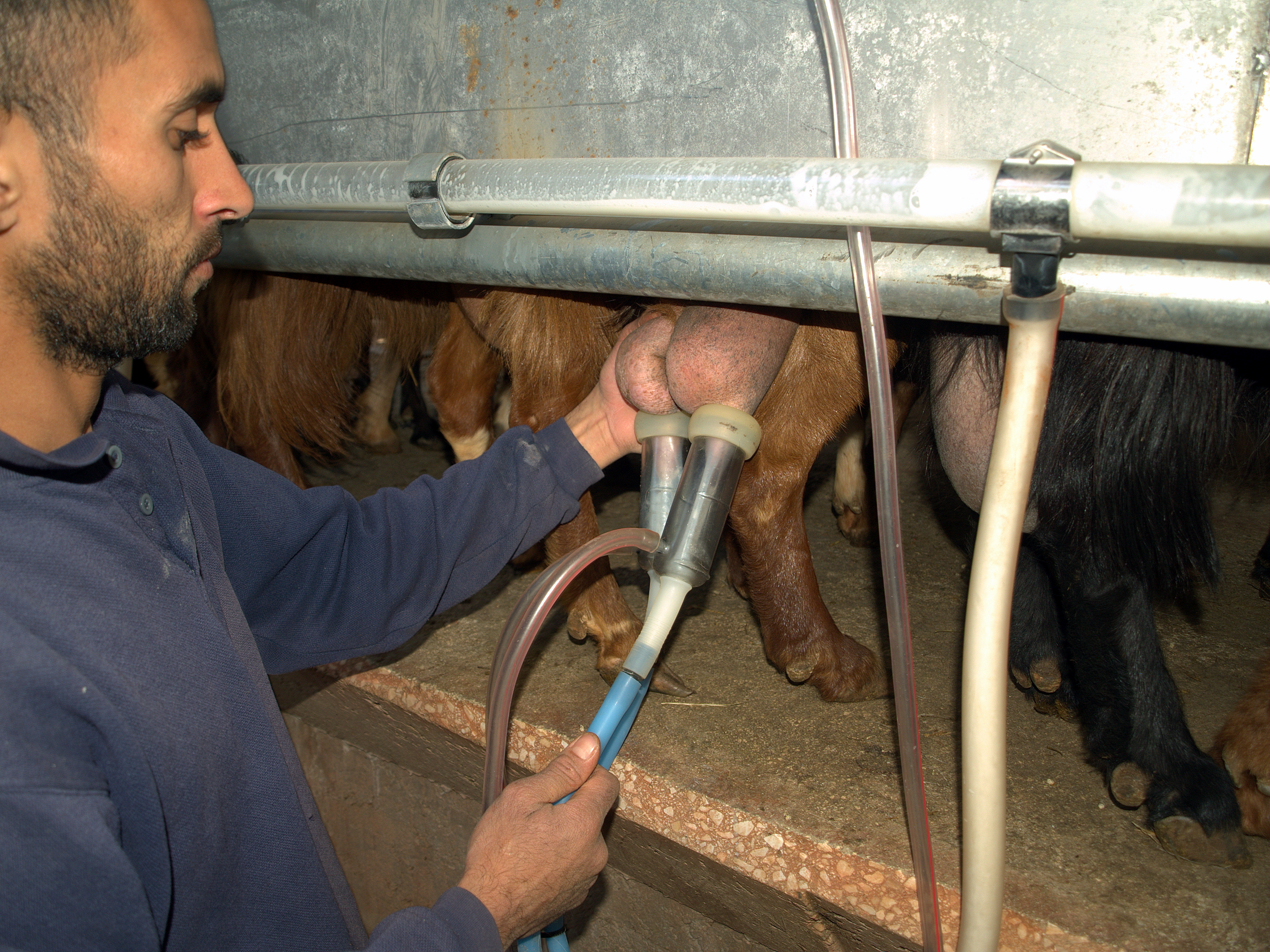
A goat being machine milked on an organic farm in Israel
