= Argentata dell'Etna =

Italian breed of goat

- Conservation status: FAO (2007): not at risk
- Country of origin: Italy
- Distribution: Sicily
- Standard: MIPAAF
- Use: milk, also meat

Traits
- Weight: Male: 50 kg; Female: 38 kg
- Height: Male: 75 cm; Female: 67 cm
- Skin colour: grey
- Coat: silver-grey
- Face colour: grey-white
- Horn status: usually horned
- Beard: usually bearded
- Tassels: usually present
- Goat; Capra aegagrus hircus

The Argentata dell'Etna (Sicilian: Argintata di l'Etna) is an Italian breed of domestic goat indigenous to the area of Mount Etna in the province of Catania and the Monti Peloritani in the province of Messina, in the Mediterranean island of Sicily, in southern Italy. It is raised mainly in that area, but also in the provinces of Enna and Palermo. It is named for the volcano and for its silvery grey coat. The origins of the breed are unknown; it shows similarities to the Garganica breed, and to other Italian grey breeds such as the Ciociara Grigia of Lazio and the Cilentana Grigia of Campania.

The Argentata dell'Etna is one of the forty-three autochthonous Italian goat breeds of limited distribution for which a herdbook is kept by the Associazione Nazionale della Pastorizia, the Italian national association of sheep- and goat-breeders. The herdbook was established in 2002. At the end of 2013 the registered population was variously reported as 1885 and as 2304; the total population is not more than 7000.

== Use ==
The average milk yield of the Argentata dell'Etna is 120 litres in 150 days for primiparous, 160 litres in 210 days for secondiparous and 180 litres in 210 days for pluriparous nannies; it may reach 300 kg. The milk averages 4.5% fat and 3.6% protein, and is used to make ricotta, both fresh and al forno, and Padduni cheese, which has PAT status.

Kids are slaughtered at the age of about one month.
