= Pizzo di Vernà =

Mountain in Italy

Coordinates: 38°00′39″N 15°14′27″E

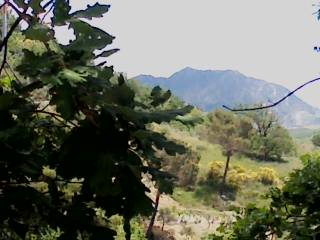
Pizzo di Vernà seen from Fondachelli-Fantina

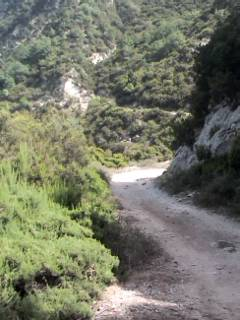
The old street at the bottom of Pizzo di Vernà - known as "Dorsale dei Peloritani"

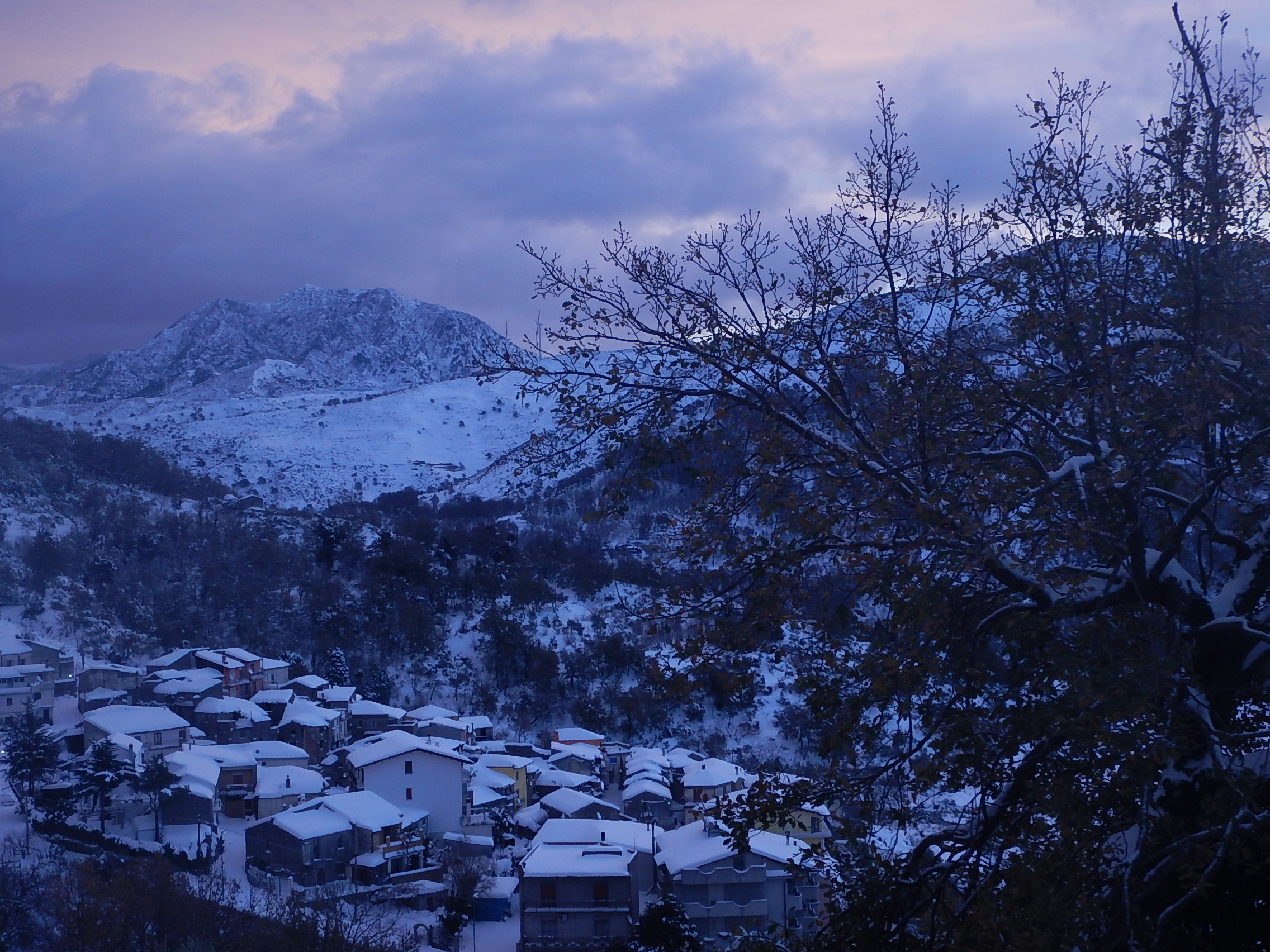
a silent Montagna di Vernà in winter over Fondachelli-Fantina

Pizzo di Vernà (also known as Montagna di Vernà, Pizzo Polo, Muntagna i Po) (1287 m) is a peak of the Peloritani Mountains, located in the province of Messina, Sicily. It is located in the South Western part of the Peloritani range in the territories of Antillo, Casalvecchio Siculo and Fondachelli-Fantina. It is a difficult peak to climb because of the typical Mediterranean vegetation on its slopes, unless you take the path on the East wall. It is visited for its stunning landscape: from the top it’is possible to view Mount Etna, mount Rocca di Salvatesta, the Ionian coast and the Tyrrhenian coast. From Fondachelli-Fantina it is possible to see the Montagna di Vernà shining in the afternoon, lit by the sun. The mountain has been designated a Site of Community Importance (SIC).

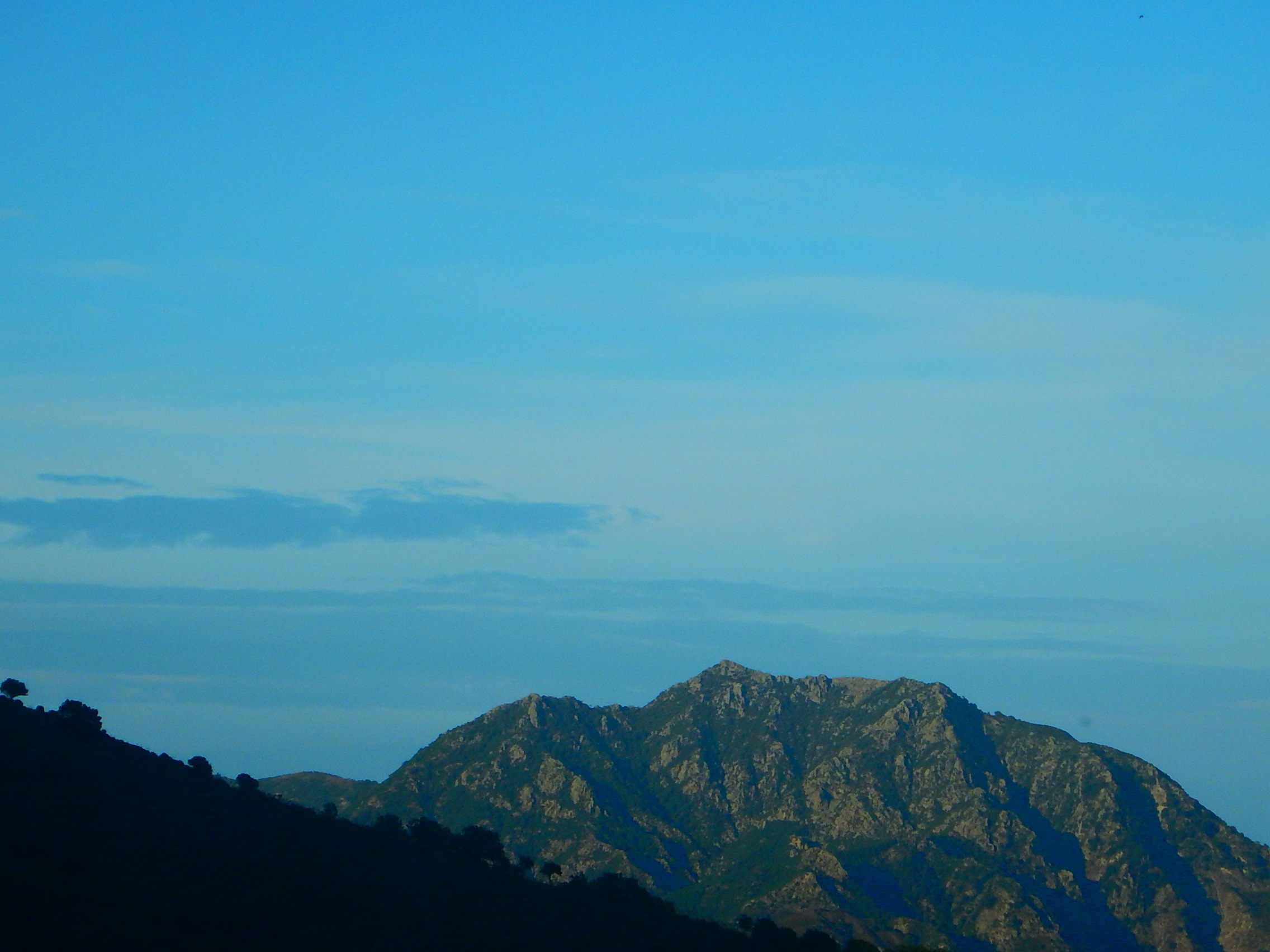
The Montagna di Vernà shines from Fondachelli-Fantina
