= Capestrina =

Italian breed of goat

- Conservation status: FAO (2007): not listed
- Other names: Capra Nera; Capra Nera Capestrina
- Country of origin: Italy
- Distribution: southern Lazio
- Standard: MIPAAF
- Use: meat, also milk

Traits
- Weight: Male: 85 kg; Female: 46–53 kg
- Height: Male: 93–94 cm; Female: 74–79 cm
- Hair colour: black; limbs often pale
- Face colour: black, often with white markings
- Horn status: horned in both sexes
- Beard: bearded
- Tassels: not always present
- Goat; Capra aegagrus hircus

The Capestrina is an Italian breed of domestic goat from the southern part of Lazio, in southern central Italy. It is one of three breeds of goat in the area, the others being the Bianca Monticellana and the Ciociara Grigia, but is usually found on higher and less accessible terrain than those breeds.

== History ==
The Capestrina originates in the provinces of Frosinone, Latina and Rome, on the spines of the Monti Aurunci, the Monti Ausoni and the Monti Lepini. It is also raised in the Monti delle Mainarde and in the Val Comino, and on the Monti Prenestini. Its geographical range is similar to that of the Bianca Monticellana and the Ciociara Grigia; it is however usually found on higher and less accessible terrain than those breeds.

It is one of the forty-three autochthonous Italian goat breeds of limited distribution for which a herdbook is kept by the Associazione Nazionale della Pastorizia, the Italian national association of sheep- and goat-breeders. At the end of 2013 the registered population was variously reported as 850 and as 991.

== Characteristics ==
The Capestrina is of medium size: weights for nannies are commonly in the range 46–53 kg, with a height at the withers of some 74–79 cm, while billies normally weigh from 80 to 85 kg and stand 93–94 cm. The coat is either black or near-black (nero focato, 'seal black'); some have white Swiss markings on the face, and these often have white on the beard, the edges of the ears, the lower legs, the belly and the perianal area. The hair of the coat varies in length from about 5 cm to more than 15 cm. The goats are always bearded, billies particularly heavily so; the horns are large and spreading, and considerably flattened at the base.

== Use ==
The average milk yield of the Capestrina, over and above that taken by the kids, is 70 litres in 100 days for primiparous, 120 litres in 150 days for secondiparous, and 150 litres in 150 days for pluriparous, nannies.

Kids are slaughtered at about 40–50 days, at a weight of 10–12 kg; or, for Ferragosto, as caprettone ('large kid'), at a live weight of about 20–25 kg.
