= Province of Messina =

Former province of Sicily, Italy

Coordinates: 38°11′N 15°33′E

- Province (1860–2015)
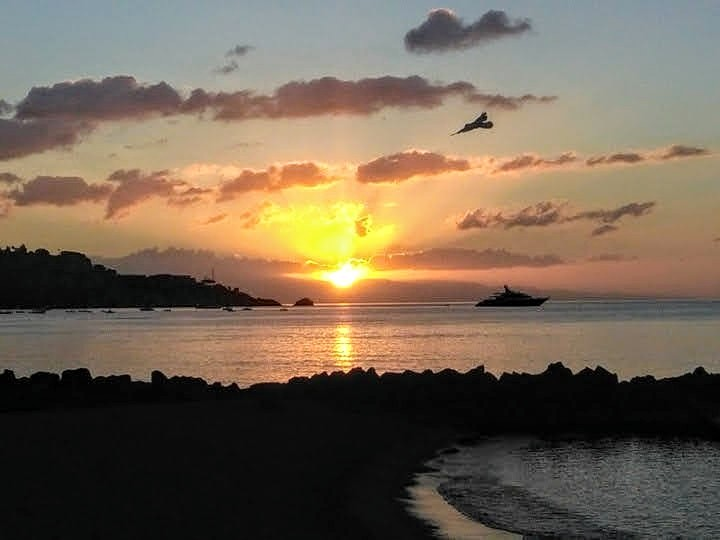
- Giardini Naxos, a popular resort in the province of Messina

- Map highlighting the location of the province of Messina in Italy
- Country: Italy
- Region: Sicily
- Capital(s): Messina
- Comuni: 108

Area
  - Total: 3,247 km^{2} (1,254 sq mi)

Population (December 2011)
  - Total: 651,921
  - Density: 200.8/km^{2} (520.0/sq mi)
- Time zone: UTC+1 (CET)
  - Summer (DST): UTC+2 (CEST)
- Postal code: 98000-98100
- Telephone prefix: 090, 0941, 0942
- Vehicle registration: ME
- ISTAT: 083

The province of Messina (Italian: provincia di Messina; Sicilian: pruvincia di Missina) was a province in the autonomous island region of Sicily, Italy. Its capital was the city of Messina. It was replaced by the Metropolitan City of Messina.

== Geography ==
=== Territory ===
It had an area of 3,247 square kilometres (1,254 mi^{2}), which amounts to 12.6 percent of total area of the island, and a total population of more 650,000. There are 108 comuni (sing.: comune) in the province .

The province included the Aeolian Islands, all part of the comune (municipality) of Lipari (with the exception of Salina). The territory is largely mountainous, with the exception of alluvial plain at the mouths of the various rivers. The largest plain is that in the area between Milazzo and Barcellona Pozzo di Gotto, which, together with Messina, form a metropolitan area of some 500,000 inhabitants, one of the largest in southern Italy. Much of the population is concentrated in the coastal area, after the hill towns have been largely abandoned from the 19th century.

The main mountain ridges are the Peloritani, up to 1,300 metres (4,300 ft) in elevation, and the Nebrodi, up to 1,900 metres (6,200 ft), which are included in a Regional Natural Reserve.

Rivers of the province include the Alcantara and the Pollina, which forms the border with the province of Palermo to the west.

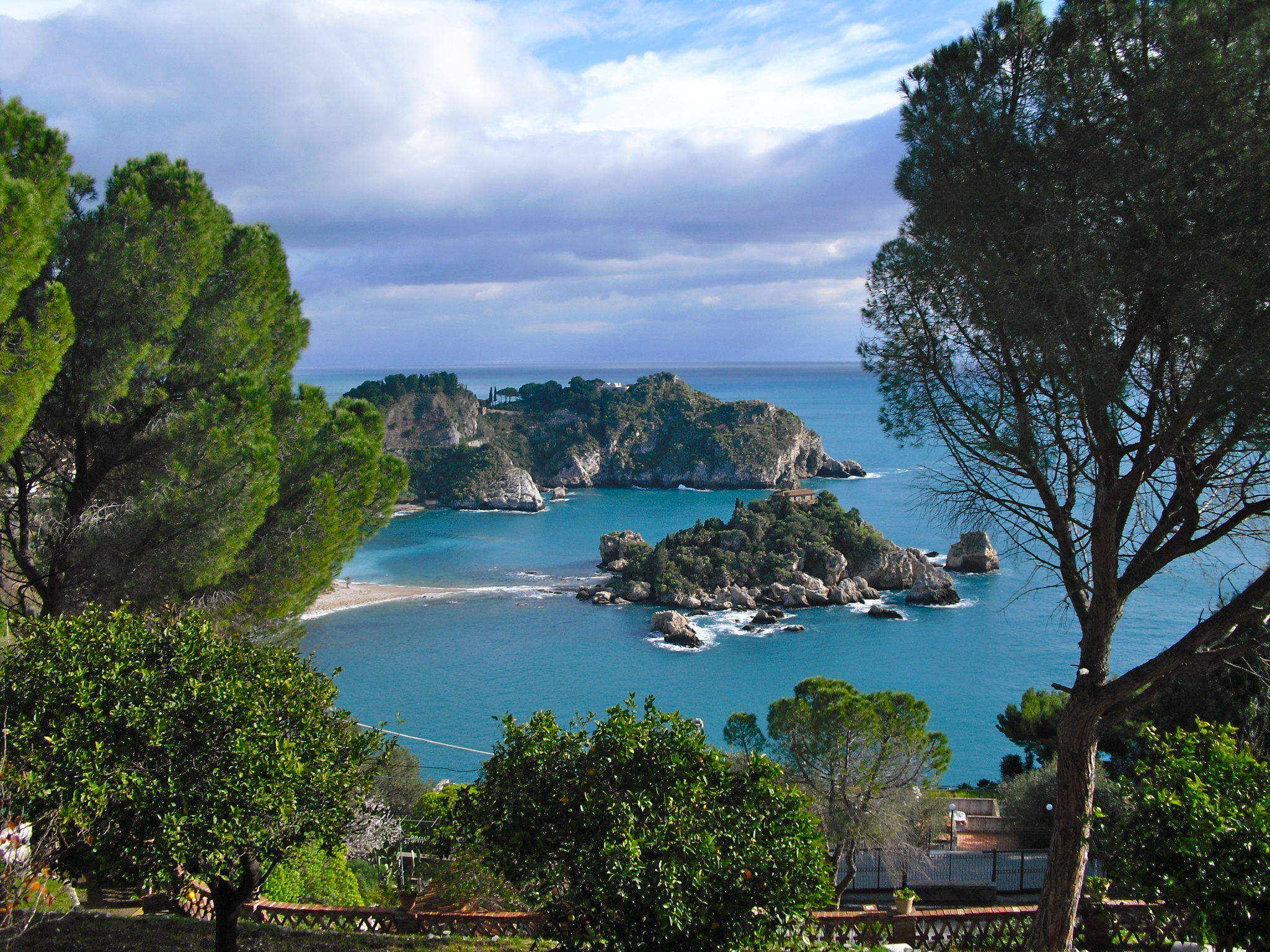
the Isola Bella at Taormina city

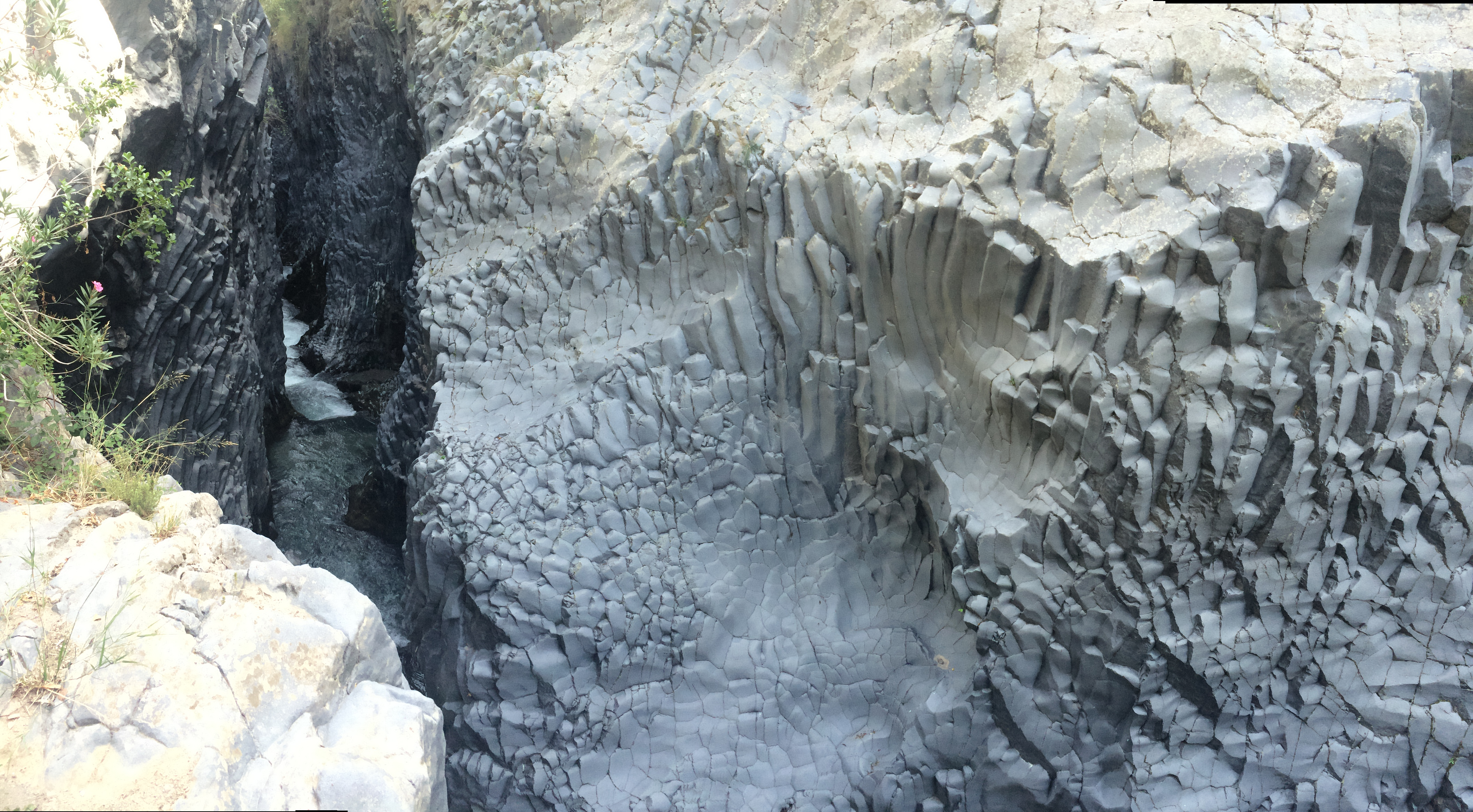
the Alcantara river canyon

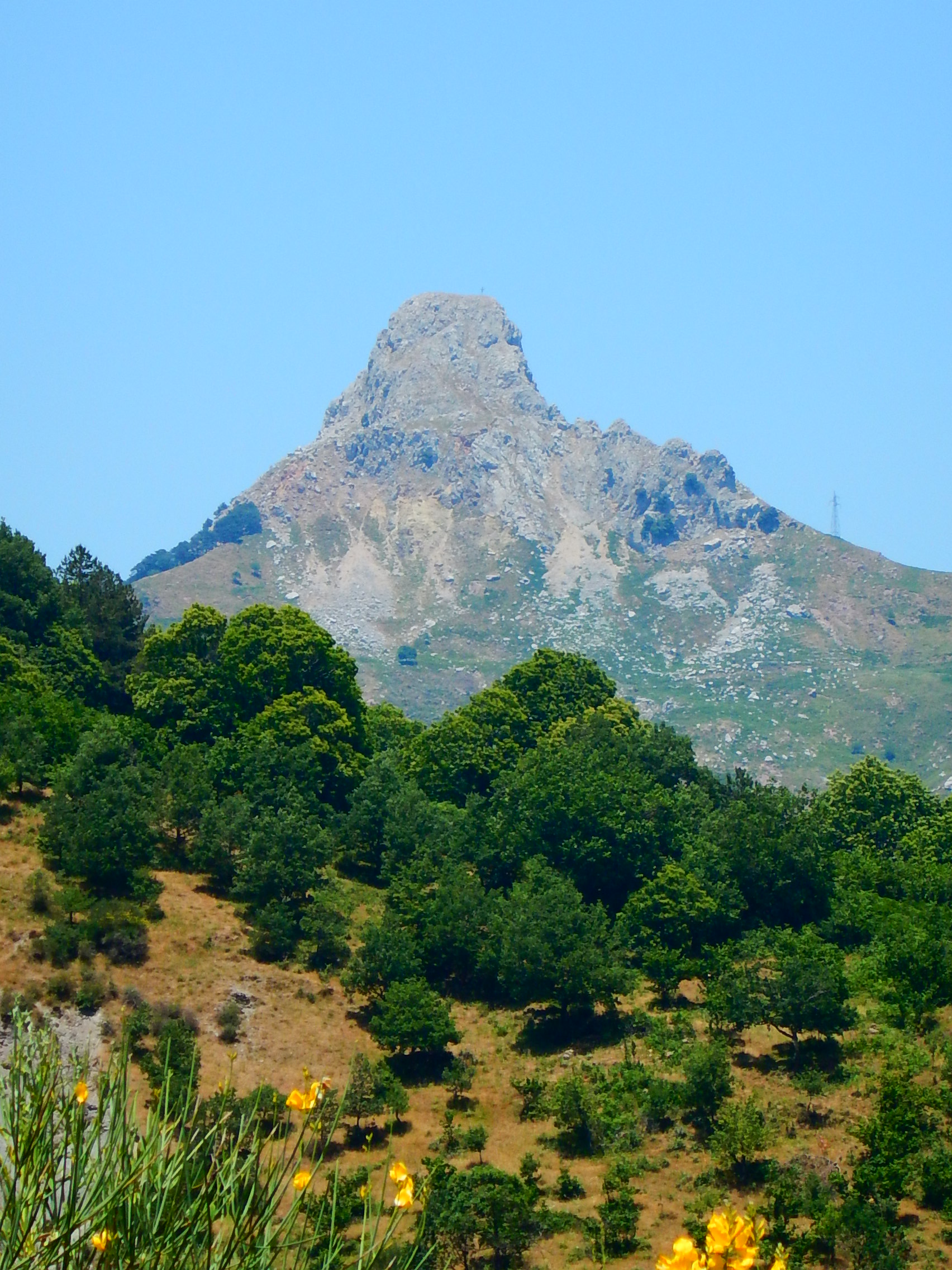
the Rocca Salvatesta face from Fondachelli-Fantina town

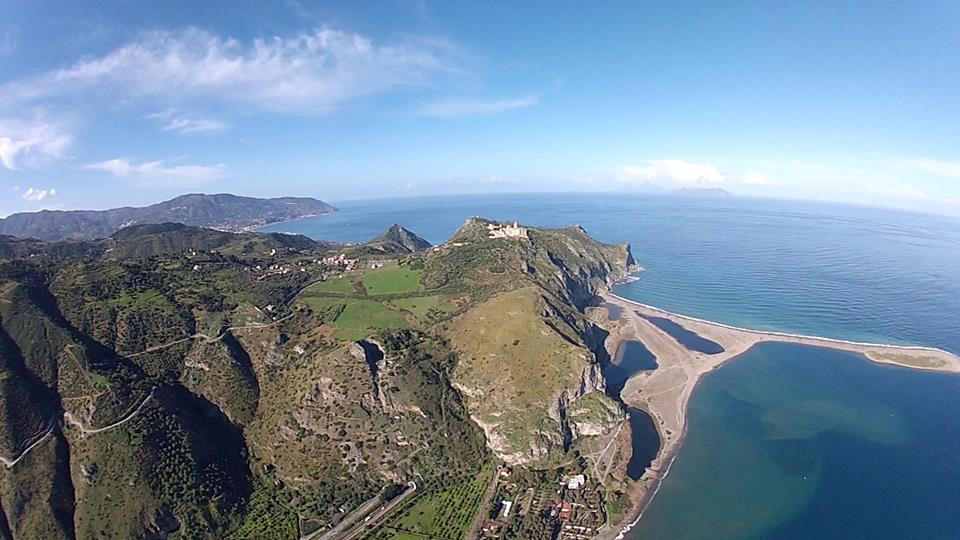
the Sanctuary of Tindari over Marinello lakes

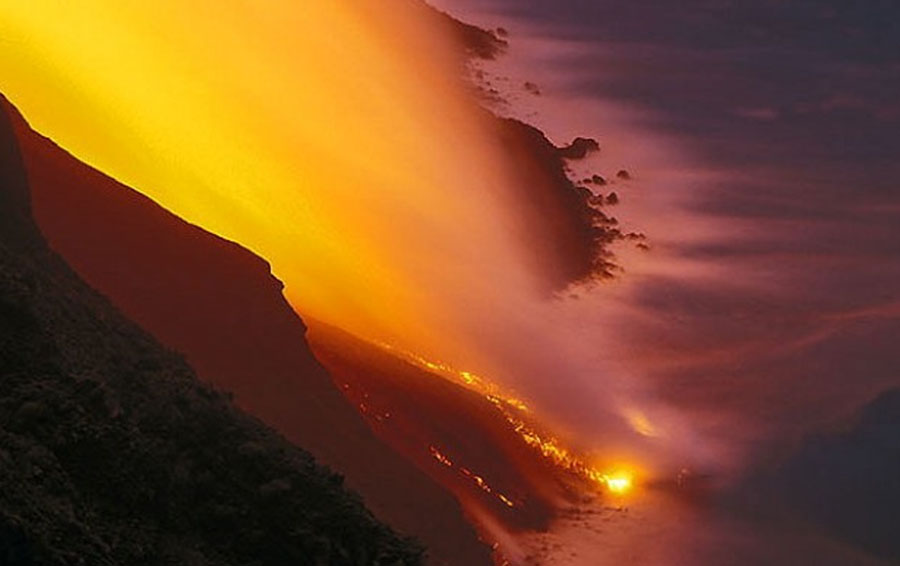
Stromboli volcano, Aeolian Islands

=== Main comuni ===
The main comuni (municipalities) by population are:

Comune	Population
Messina	246,951
Barcellona Pozzo di Gotto	41,157
Milazzo	32,600
Patti	13,241
Sant'Agata di Militello	13,026
Capo d'Orlando	12,928
Taormina	10,909
Lipari	10,782

== Traditions ==
=== Religious Feasts and tradition ===
date	Feast	City
6 December	Feast of Saint Nicholas	Saponara
8 December	Feast of the Immaculate Conception	Saponara
13 December	Feast of Saint Lucy	Santa Lucia del Mela
6 January	living Nativity scene	Montalbano Elicona
20 January	Feast of Saint Sebastian	Mistretta
19 March	Feast of Saint Joseph	Oliveri and Merì
19 March and Tuesday after Easter	Feast of Saint Joseph	Piraino
last March Friday	Procession of SS Crucifix with the hodeeds blu "i babbaluti"	San Marco d'Alunzio
Easter Friday	Procession of the "Barette"	Messina
the 11-12 and third Sunday of May	Feast of Saint Philip of Agira	Limina
3 June	Feast of the Madonna della Lettera	Messina and Itala
12 June	Feast of the Madonna di Montalto	Messina
13 June and following Sunday	Feast of Anthony of Padua	Milazzo
24 June	Feast of Saint John the Baptist	Castanea, Messina
29 June	Feast of Saint Peter and Saint Paul	San Pier Niceto
2 July	Feast of Our Lady of Graces	Furci Siculo
first Sunday of July	Feast of Saint Maria Annunziata	Merì
first Sunday of July	Feast of the Madonna of the saint water	Valdina
first Sunday of July	Feast of Our Lady of Graces	Naso
second Sunday of July	Feast of the Saint Guardian Angel	Fondachelli-Fantina
16 July	Feast of Our Lady of Mount Carmel	Roccalumera
25 July	Feast of the Saint James	Capizzi
first Sunday of August	Feast on the sea of the Saint Mary of Porto Salvo	Santa Teresa di Riva
3 August	Feast of the Madonna of Dinnammare	Larderia, Messina
5 August	Feast of the Saint Mary of the Snows	Santa Lucia del Mela
9–10 August	Feast of Saint Lorenz	Frazzanò
second Sunday of August	Feast of Saint Lucy	Savoca
second Sunday of August	Feast of Saint Sebastian	Gaggi
15 August	Feast on the Assumption of Mary	Novara di Sicilia and Messina
first Sunday of September	Feast of the Madonna of the chain	Mongiuffi Melia
8 September	Feast of the Madonna of the Divine providence	Fondachelli-Fantina
7–8 September	Feast of the black Madonna of Tindari	Tindari

== See also ==
- Metropolitan City of Messina
- Strait of Messina metropolitan area
- Strait of Messina
- History of Sicily
- Aeolian Islands
- Niceto Valley
