= Cilentana Grigia =

Italian breed of goat

- Conservation status: FAO (2007): endangered
- Country of origin: Italy
- Distribution: province of Salerno
- Standard: MIPAAF
- Use: milk, also meat

Traits
- Weight: Male: 70 kg; Female: 50 kg
- Height: Male: 77 cm; Female: 70 cm
- Skin colour: grey to black
- Coat: grey
- Face color: grey
- Horn status: about 50% are horned
- Beard: males bearded, females 80% bearded
- Tassels: 60% with tassels
- Goat; Capra aegagrus hircus

The Cilentana Grigia is an Italian breed of domestic goat indigenous to the province of Salerno, in Campania in southern Italy. It takes its name from the geographical region of the Cilento – much of which is today within the Parco Nazionale del Cilento, Vallo di Diano e Alburni – and is raised mainly in that area, but also in the Monti Alburni and the Monti Picentini. It is one of three indigenous goat breeds in the Cilento, the others being the Cilentana Fulva and the Cilentana Nera. The Cilentana Grigia is found on lower ground and richer pasture than the Cilentana Nera, and is raised mainly for milk. The origins of the breed are obscure; it shows the influence of the Maltese and Garganica breeds, and similarities to other Italian grey breeds such as the Ciociara Grigia of Lazio and the Argentata dell'Etna from Sicily.

The Cilentana Grigia is one of the forty-three autochthonous Italian goat breeds of limited distribution for which a herdbook is kept by the Associazione Nazionale della Pastorizia, the Italian national association of sheep- and goat-breeders. In 2008, 768 head were registered; at the end of 2013 the registered population was 134.
