= Dorsale dei Peloritani =

Coordinates: 38.15959°N 15.46785°E

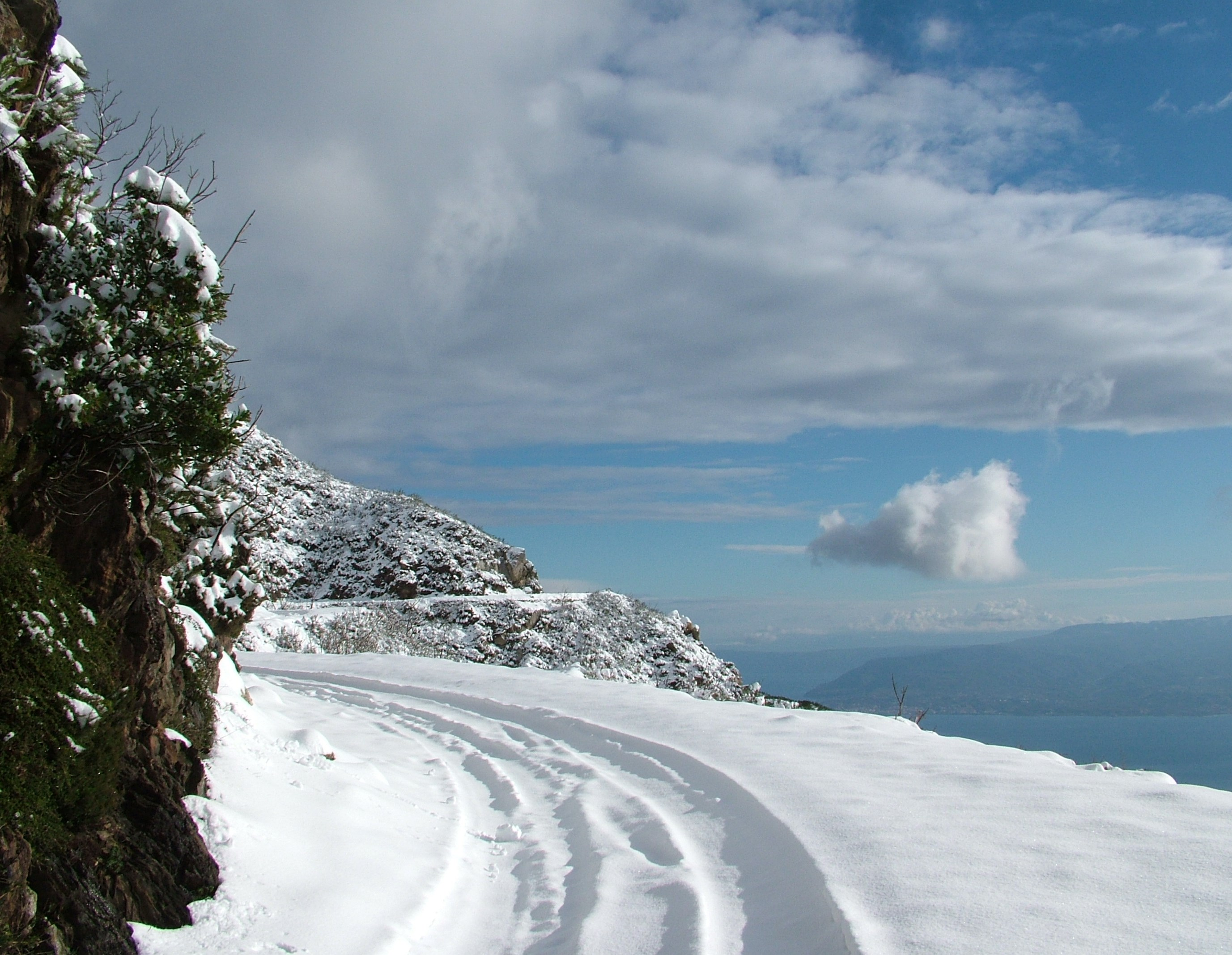
A white Dorsale dei Peloritani hugs the Strait of Messina

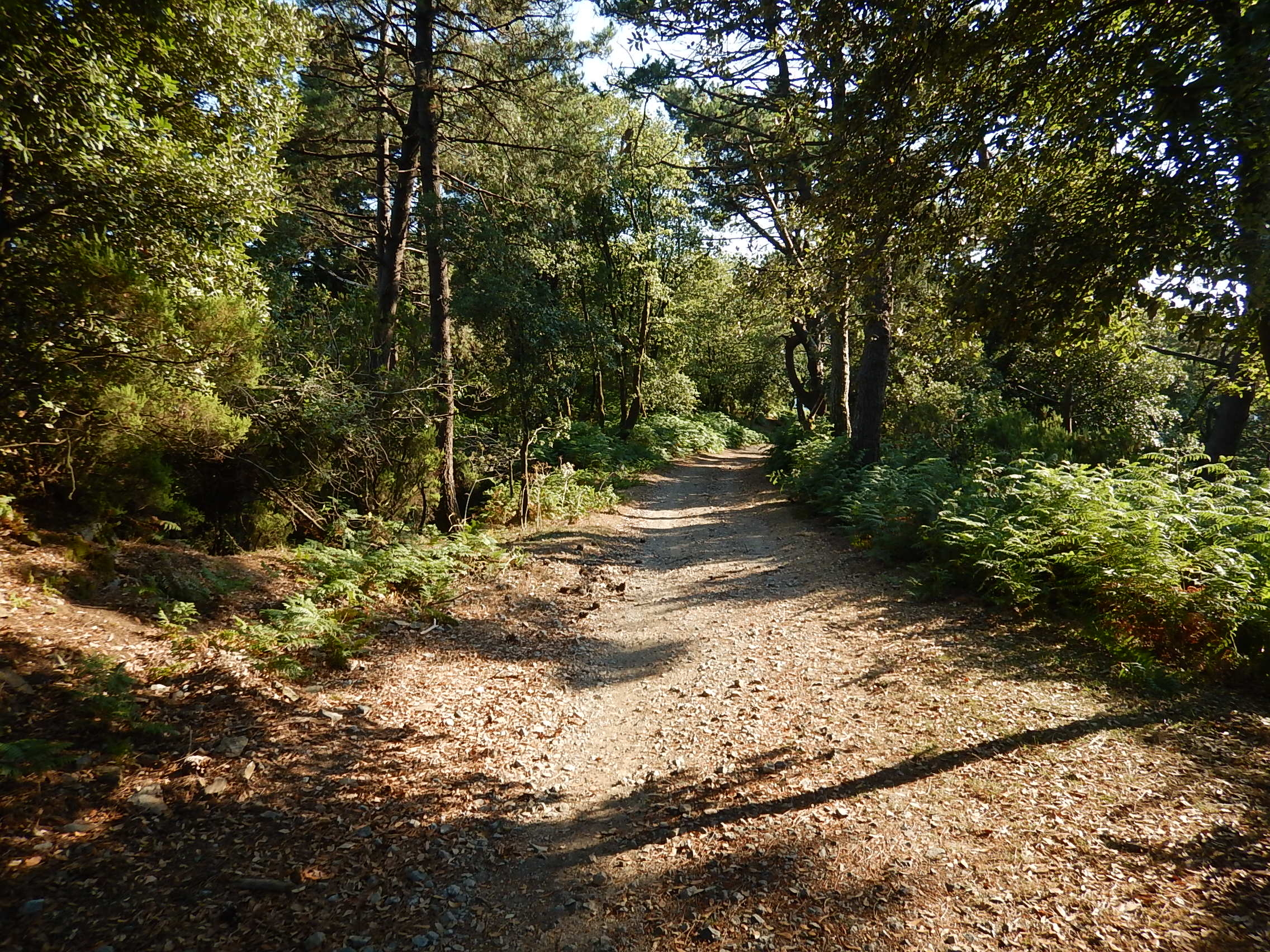
Segment with trees of the Dorsale dei Peloritani

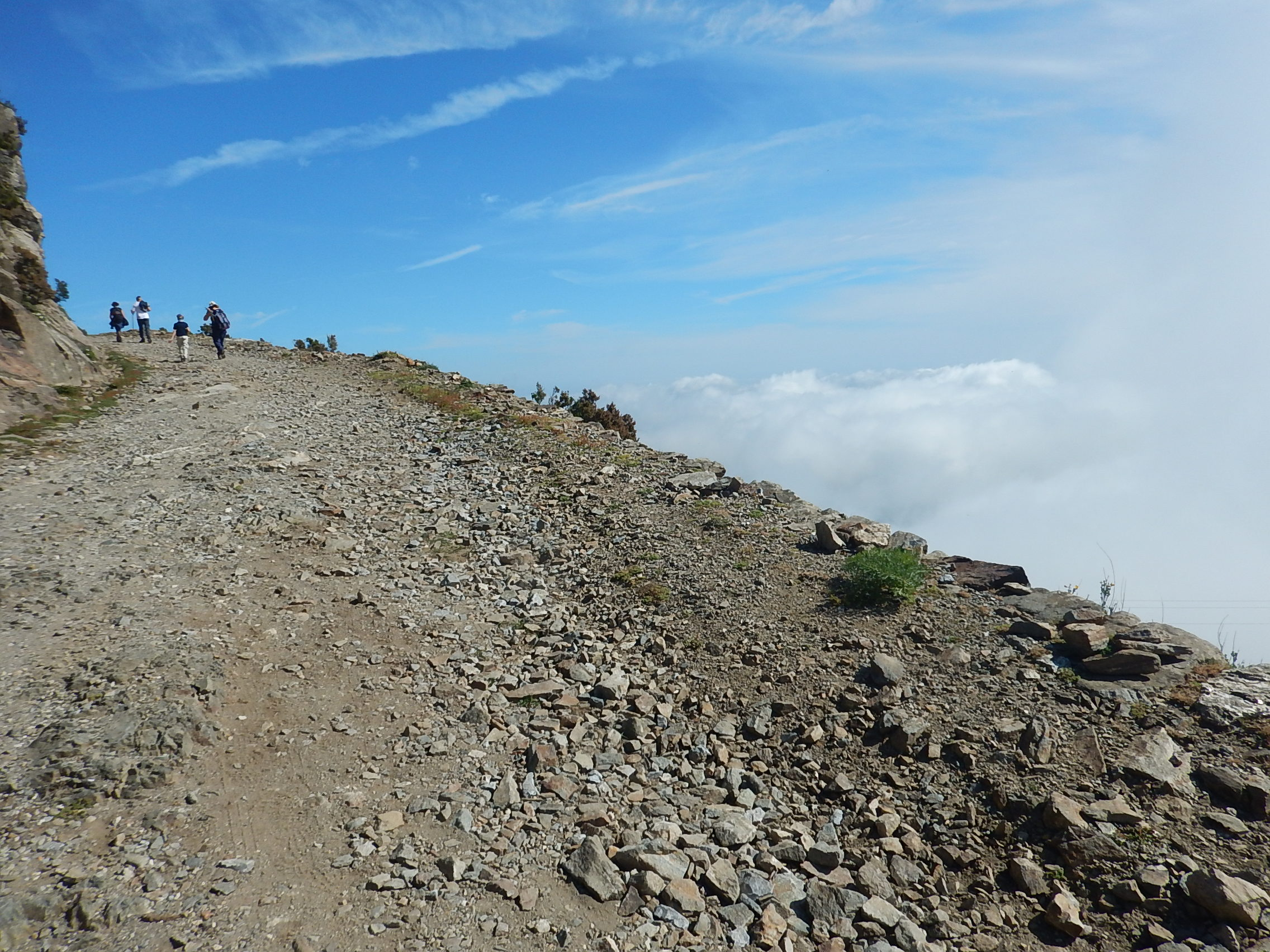
The Dorsale dei Peloritani is linked by about a thousand of paths to the little villages of the valleys.

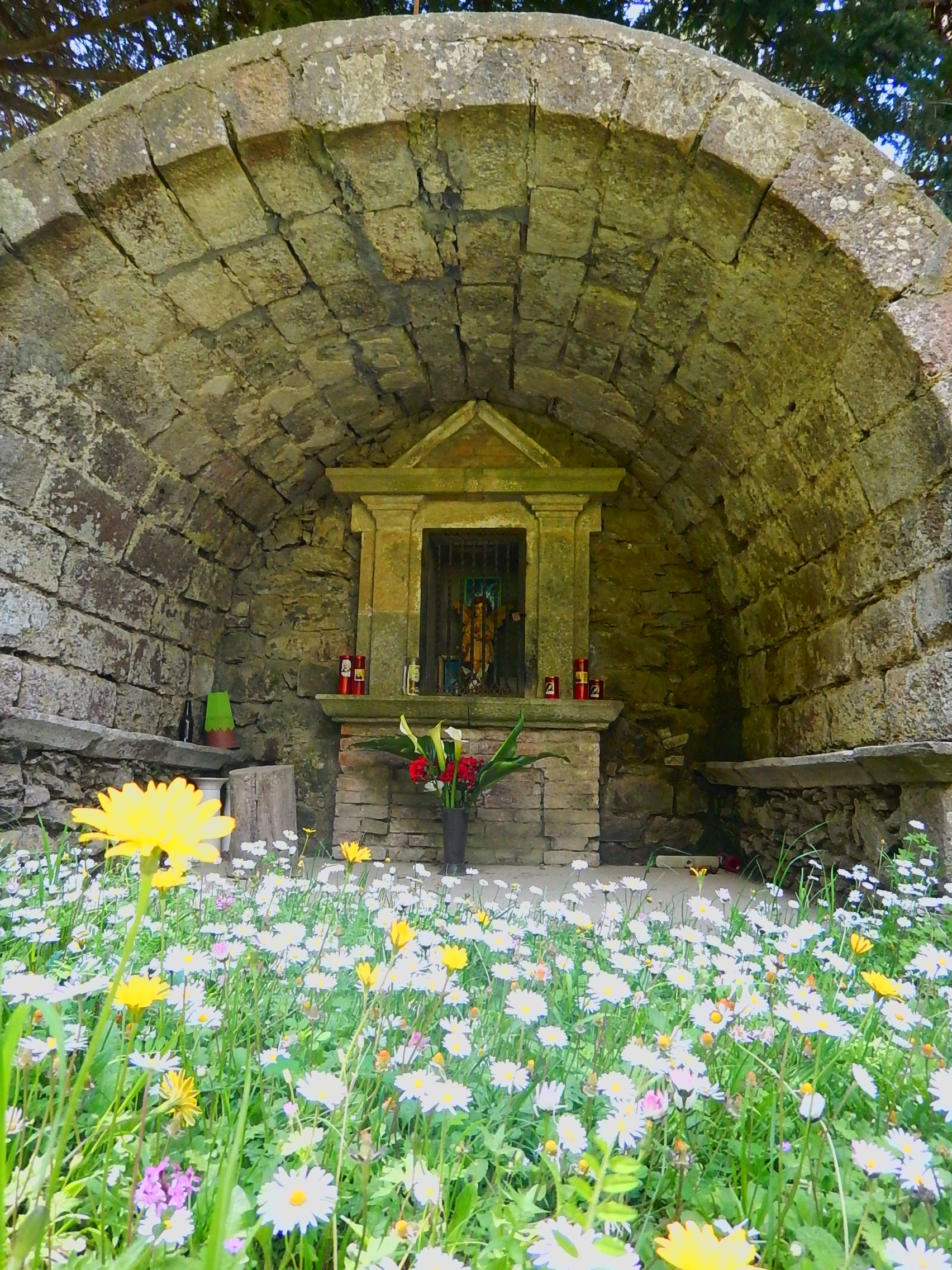
Wayside shrine dedicated at the Guardian Angel near the top of Mount Tre Fontane is one of the several wayside shrines along the Dorsale dei Peloritani path

The Dorsale dei Peloritani is a 70 km (43 mi) panoramic path that runs through the Peloritani mountains in Sicily at a height of around 1,000 m (3,300 ft). Its origins are lost in time. It starts from Monte Dinnammare, overlooking the Strait of Messina where there is the homonymous sanctuary, and ends at Rocca di Novara.
