= Biviere Lake =

Lake in Cesarò, Italy

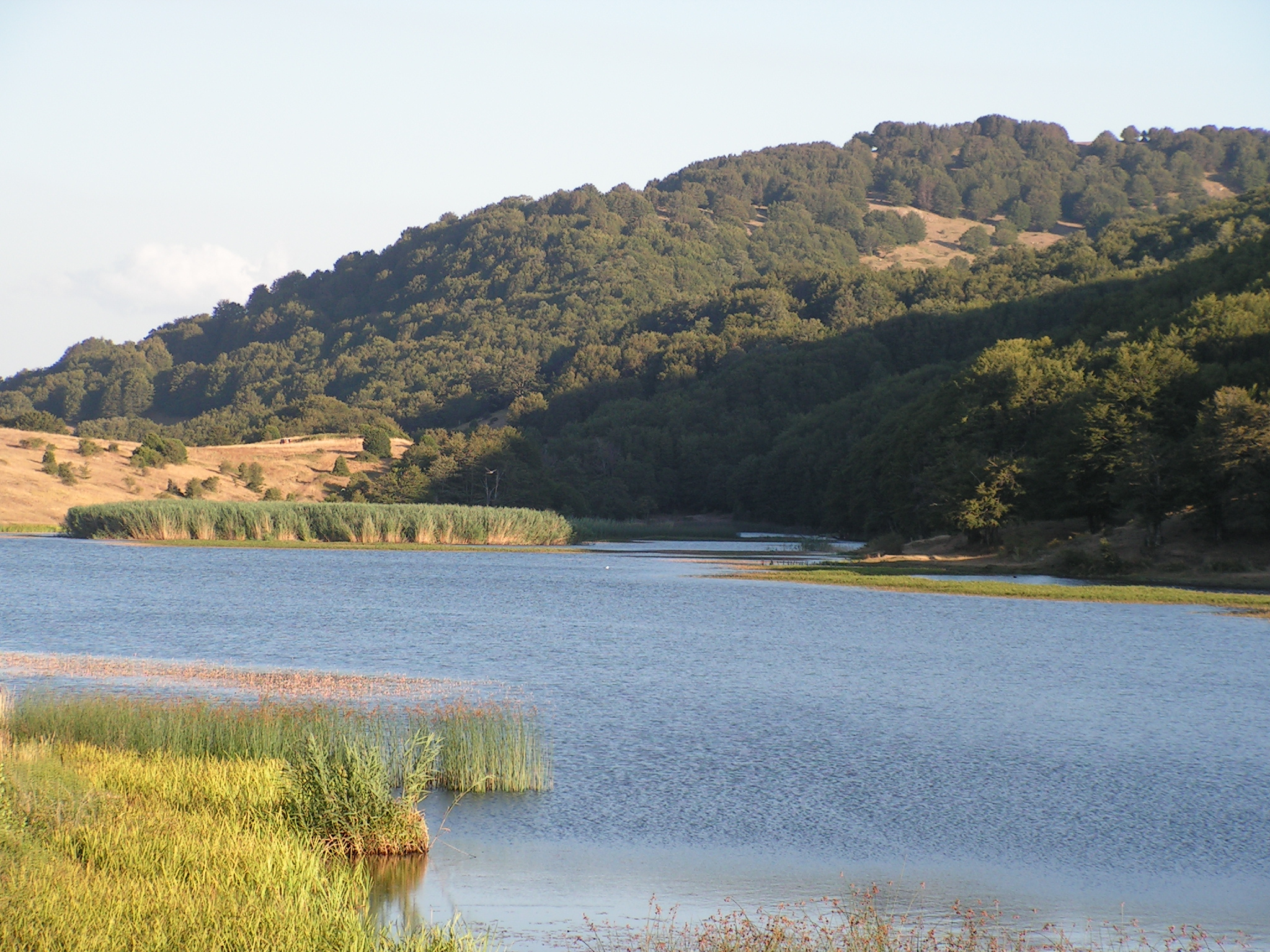

- Location within Sicily
- Location: Province of Messina, Sicily
- Coordinates: 37°57′10″N 14°42′56″E
- Catchment area: 2 km^{2} (0.77 sq mi)
- Basin countries: Italy
- Surface area: 0.2 km^{2} (0.077 sq mi)
- Average depth: 0.5 m (1 ft 8 in)
- Max. depth: 3 m (9.8 ft)
- Water volume: 100,000 m^{3} (3,500,000 cu ft)
- Surface elevation: 1,274 m (4,180 ft)

Biviere Di Cesarò is a lake in the Province of Messina, Sicily, Italy in the Nebrodi mountains. It has an elevation of around 1274m above sea level, surface area of 0.2 km^{2} and a maximum depth of 3m.
