= Fantina =

Fantina may refer to:

- Fantina, a character from Pokémon
- Fantina, a former town on one side of a river separated from Fondachelli
