= Cilentana Nera =

Italian breed of goat

- Conservation status: FAO (2007): not at risk; DAD-IS (2025): at risk/critical
- Country of origin: Italy
- Distribution: province of Salerno
- Standard: MIPAAF
- Use: mainly meat

Traits
- Weight: Male: 65 kg; Female: 50 kg
- Height: Male: 76 cm; Female: 70 cm
- Skin colour: black
- Coat: black
- Face colour: black
- Horn status: 60% are horned
- Beard: usually bearded
- Tassels: in about 50% of cases
- Goat; Capra aegagrus hircus

The Cilentana Nera is an Italian breed of domestic goat indigenous to the province of Salerno, in Campania in southern Italy. It takes its name from the geographical region of the Cilento, much of which is today within the Parco Nazionale del Cilento, Vallo di Diano e Alburni, and is raised mainly in that area and in the Monti Alburni. The range extends to the Monti Picentini and to the area of Ricigliano in eastern Campania and Muro Lucano in Basilicata. It is one of three goat breeds in the Cilento, the others being the Cilentana Grigia and the Cilentana Fulva. The Cilentana Nera is found on higher ground and on poorer pasture than the other two, and is raised mainly for meat. It has been influenced by the Garganica and Napoletana goat breeds.

The Cilentana Nera is one of the forty-three autochthonous Italian goat breeds of limited distribution for which a herdbook is kept by the Associazione Nazionale della Pastorizia, the Italian national association of sheep- and goat-breeders. In the 1980s numbers were very low, and in 1983 the breed was thought to be close to extinction; however, a census in 2008 found 3683 head, and at the end of 2013 the registered population was variously reported as 2403 and as 2098.
