= Bianca Monticellana =

Breed of goat

- Conservation status: FAO (2007): not listed
- Other names: Capra Bianca di Monte San Biagio
- Country of origin: Italy
- Distribution: Lazio
- Standard: MIPAAF
- Use: dual-purpose, meat and milk

Traits
- Weight: Male: 81–82 kg; Female: 38–53 kg
- Height: Male: 84–85 cm; Female: 72–78 cm
- Skin color: pinkish white
- Wool color: white
- Face color: white
- Horn status: horned in both sexes
- Goat; Capra aegagrus hircus

The Bianca Monticellana or Capra Bianca di Monte San Biagio is an indigenous breed of domestic goat from Lazio in central Italy. It takes its name from the town and comune of Monte San Biagio, which until 1862 was known as Monticelli. It is raised in the provinces of Frosinone and Rome, on the Monti Aurunci, the Monti Ausoni, the Monti Lepini, the Monti delle Mainarde in the Val Comino and on the Monti Prenestini. The area of distribution is very similar to that of the Ciociara Grigia, from which it is however quite distinct. The Bianca Monticellana breed descends from a flock of about 700 head of white goats brought to Monticelli from Villa Latina in about 1850 by the Minchella family of shepherds. It is probably the same breed described as "Bianca Romana" ("Roman white") in the early years of the twentieth century, and not subsequently documented.

The Bianca Monticellana is one of the forty-three autochthonous Italian goat breeds of limited distribution for which a herdbook is kept by the Associazione Nazionale della Pastorizia, the Italian national association of sheep- and goat-breeders. At the end of 2013 the registered population was variously reported as 1832 and as 2043.
