= Cilentana Fulva =

Breed of goat

- Conservation status: FAO (2007): not at risk
- Country of origin: Italy
- Distribution: province of Salerno
- Standard: MIPAAF
- Use: milk, also meat

Traits
- Weight: Male: 60 kg; Female: 45 kg
- Height: Male: 80 cm; Female: 70 cm
- Skin color: tawny-brown
- Wool color: uniform tawny-brown
- Face color: tawny-brown
- Horn status: 35% are horned
- Beard: 70% are bearded
- Tassels: 60% with tassels
- Goat; Capra aegagrus hircus

The Cilentana Fulva is an indigenous breed of domestic goat from the province of Salerno, in Campania in southern Italy. It takes its name from the geographical region of the Cilento, much of which is today within the Parco Nazionale del Cilento, Vallo di Diano e Alburni, and is raised in that area, in the Monti Picentini, and throughout the province of Salerno. It is one of three indigenous goat breeds in the Cilento, the others being the Cilentana Grigia and the Cilentana Nera. The Cilentana Fulva is found on lower ground and richer pasture than the Cilentana Nera, and is raised mainly for milk. It appears to derive from inter-breeding of local goats with the Maltese and particularly the Derivata di Siria, with which it shares many characteristics.

The Cilentana Fulva is one of the forty-three autochthonous Italian goat breeds of limited distribution for which a herdbook is kept by the Associazione Nazionale della Pastorizia, the Italian national association of sheep- and goat-breeders. In 2008, about 1600 head were registered; at the end of 2013 the registered population was variously reported as 311 and as 297.
