= Monte Dinnammare =

Mountain in Italy

Coordinates: 38°09′33″N 15°27′53″E

The Monte Dinnammare (1130 m) is the mountain that dominates the city of Messina on the eastern edge of Sicily, belonging to the Peloritani range. From its top it is possible to enjoy the panorama of the two seas, Ionian and Tyrrhenian, the Aeolian Islands, the Strait of Messina and Mount Etna. The Madonna of Dinnammare Sanctuary is located on its top and every third day of August, in the evening, a traditional procession starts from the village of Larderia in Messina to arrive at sunrise on the following day at the Sanctuary to celebrate the Madonna of Dinnammare with a mass.

A few metres below the top of the mount an ancient path named Dorsale dei Peloritani starts, going through all the ridge line of the Peloritani mountains. The mount is a natural theatre for birdwatching of the birds that cross the Strait of Messina every year. Twenty kilometres is the distance between the port of Messina and its top.

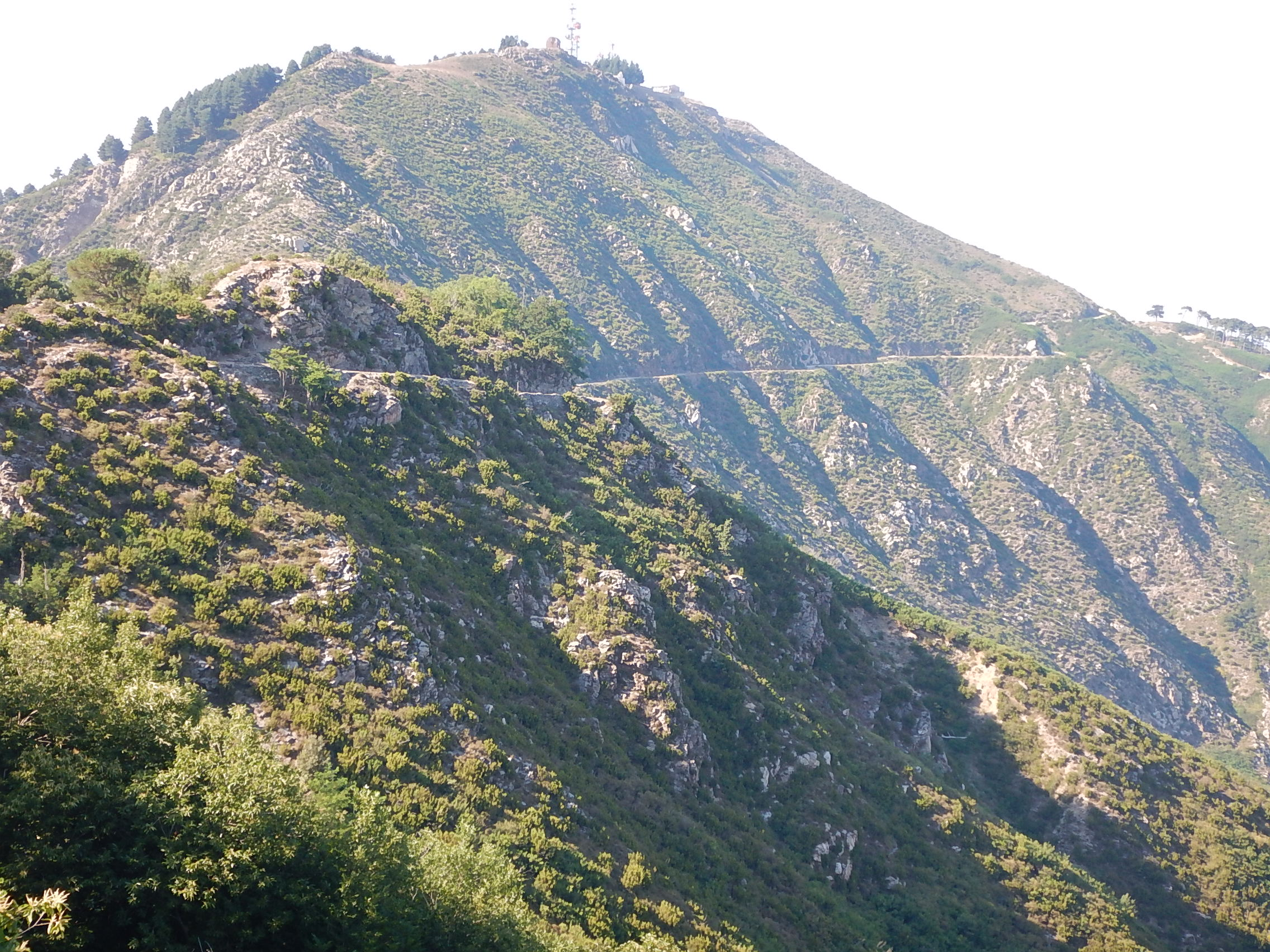
monte Dinnammare

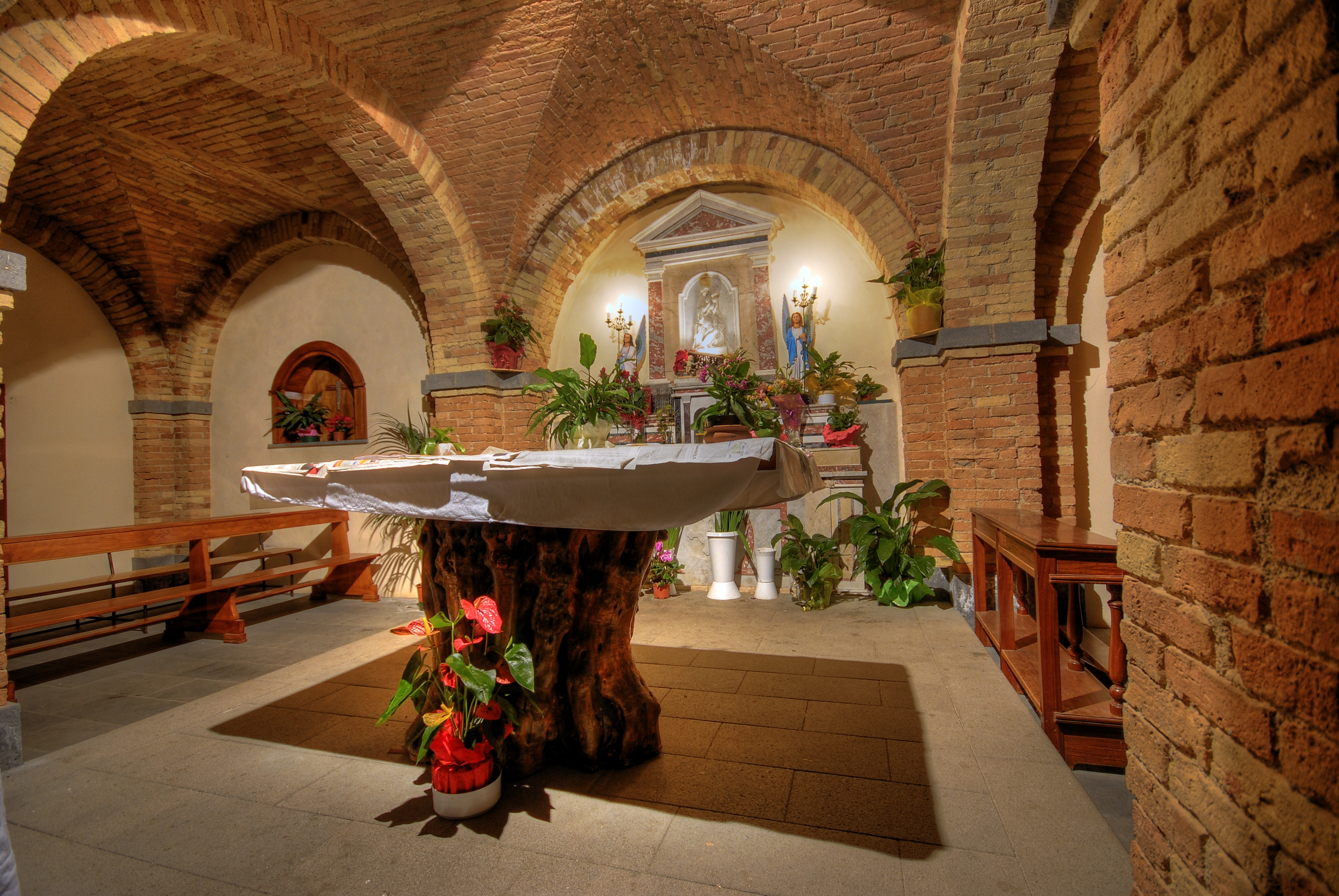
Inside the Sanctuary of Dinnammare

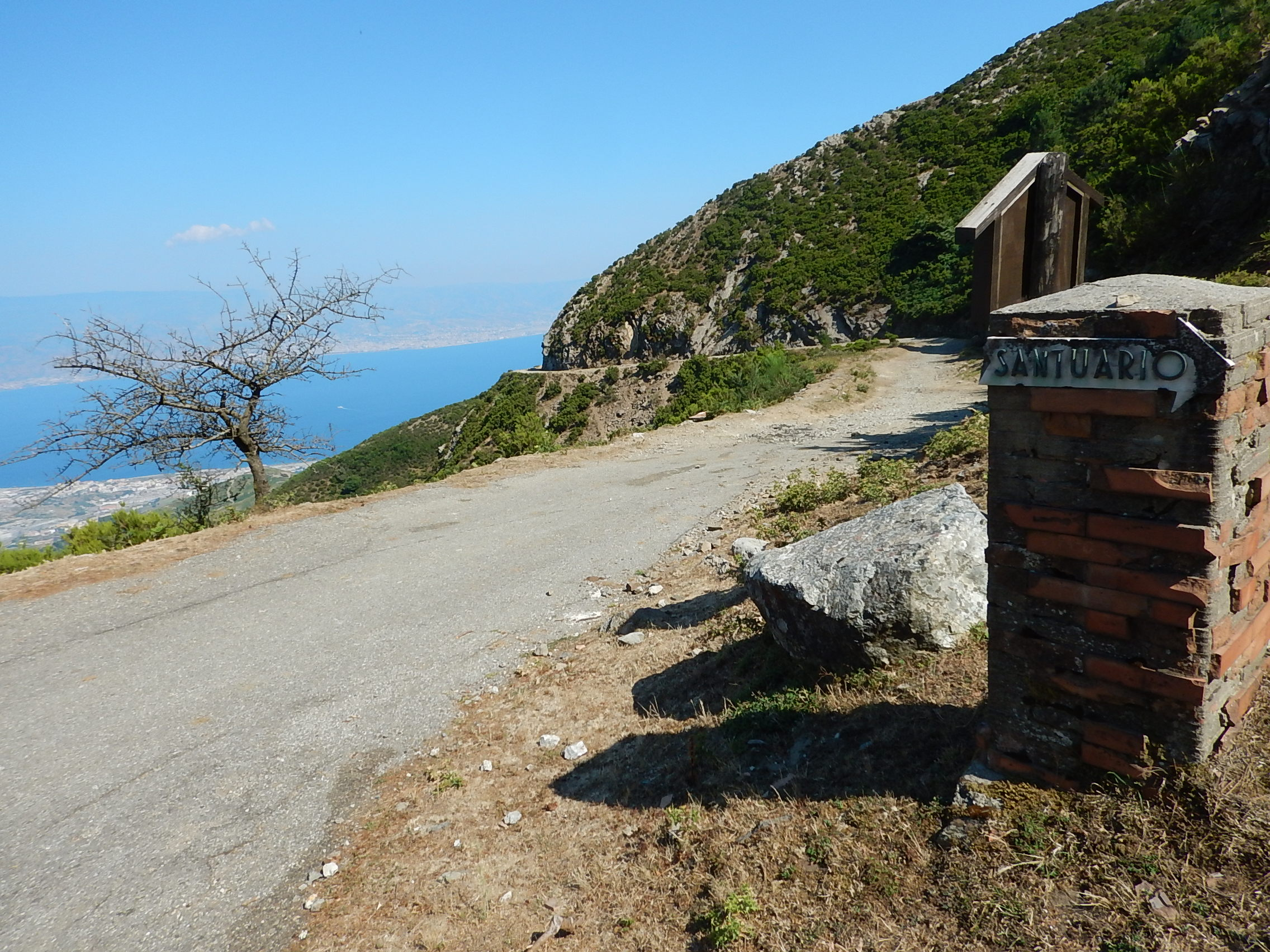
the Dorsale dei Peloritani start
