= Fondachelli-Fantina =

- Comune
- Comune di Fondachelli-Fantina
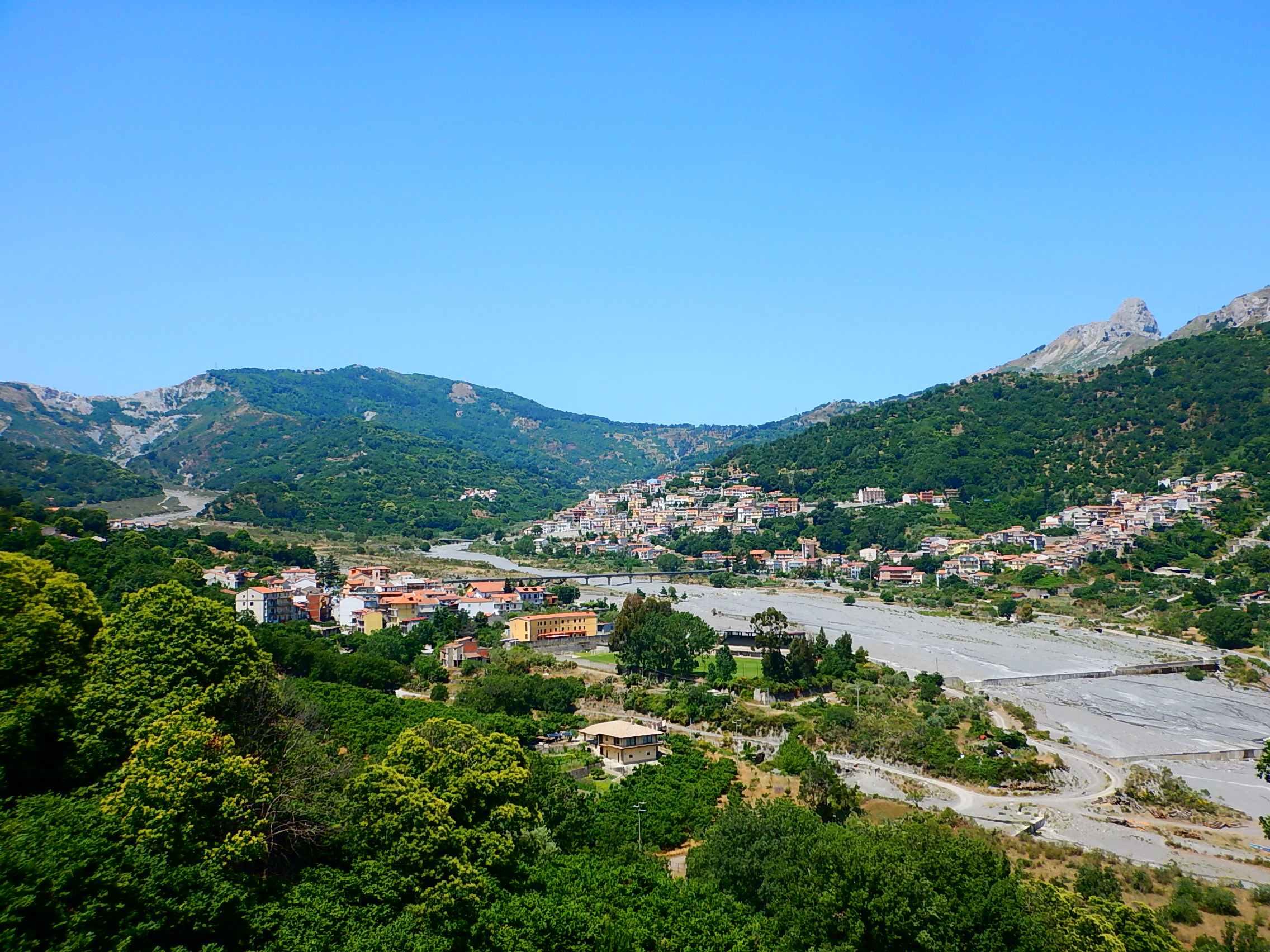
- View of Fondachelli Fantina under the Rocca di Salvatesta

- Location within Italy Location within Sicily
- Coordinates: 37°59′N 15°10′E
- Country: Italy
- Region: Sicily
- Metropolitan city: Messina (ME)

Government
  - Mayor: Francesco Pettinato

Area
  - Total: 41.0 km^{2} (15.8 sq mi)
- Elevation: 604 m (1,982 ft)

Population (30 November 2011)
  - Total: 1,117
  - Density: 27.2/km^{2} (70.6/sq mi)
- Demonym: Fondachellesi or fantinesi
- Time zone: UTC+1 (CET)
  - Summer (DST): UTC+2 (CEST)
- Postal code: 98050
- Dialing code: 0941
- Website: Official website

Fondachelli-Fantina (Gallo-Italic of Sicily: Funnaghellu) is a comune (municipality) in the Metropolitan City of Messina, Sicily, southern Italy. Situated between Novara and Francavilla di Sicilia, in the southern Peloritani mountains, it is 604 metres (1,982 ft) above sea level. The community borders the municipalities of Antillo and Rodì Milici. The most populated villages are Rubino, Evangelisti, Chiesa, Figheri and Fantina. It is 73 kilometres (45 mi) from Messina.

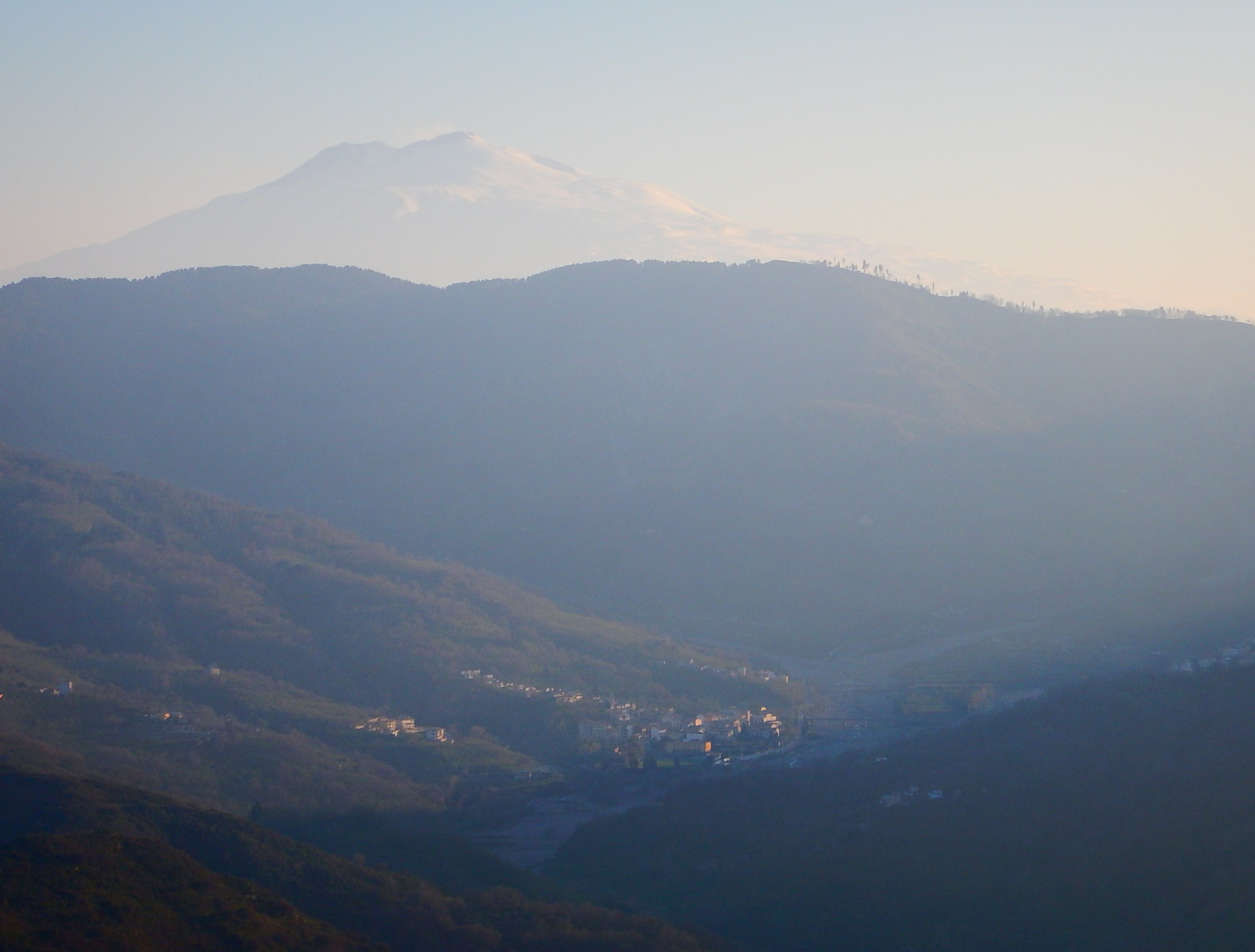
The Fondachelli Fantina Valley around the Patrì creek

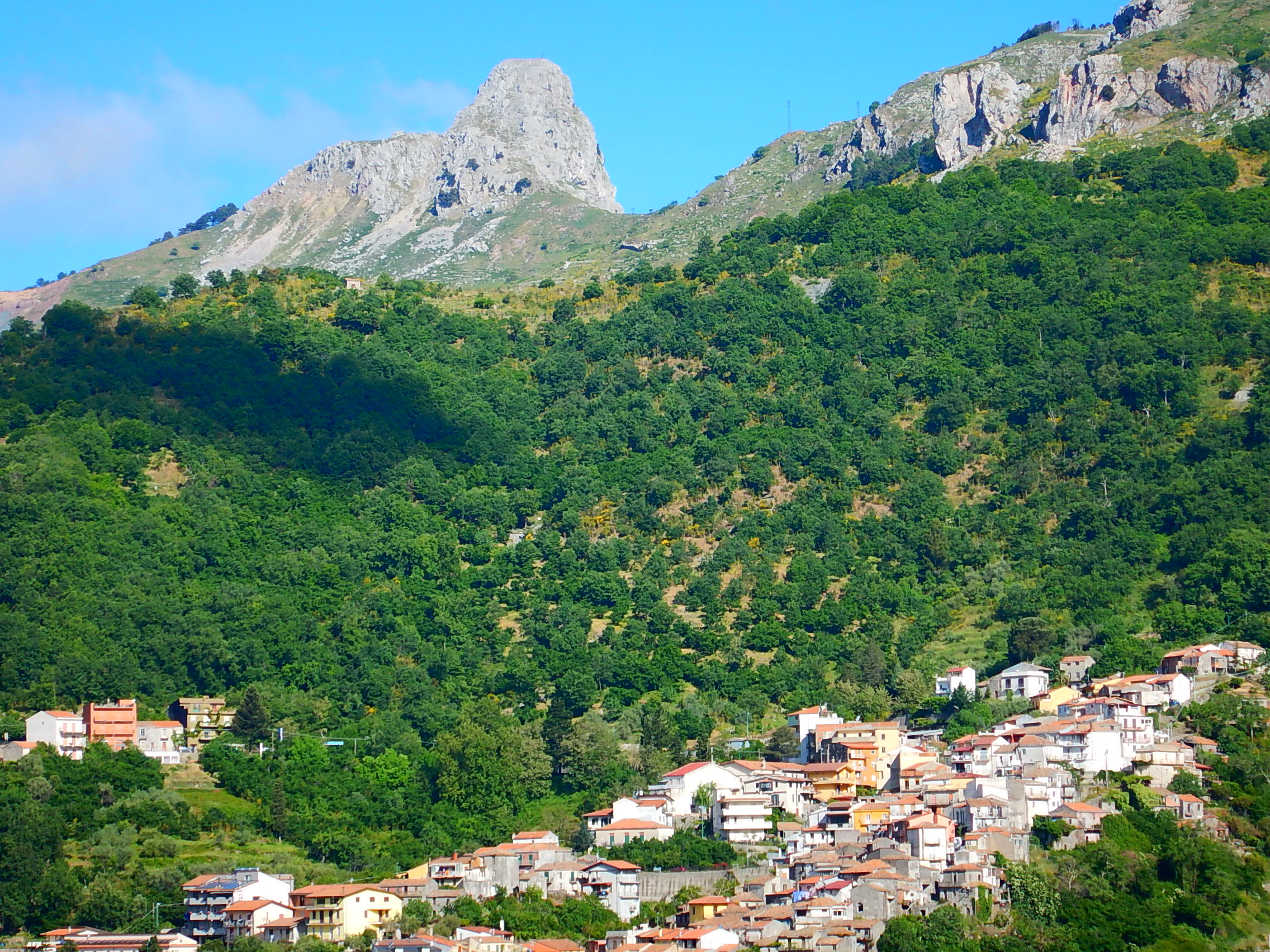
Landscape

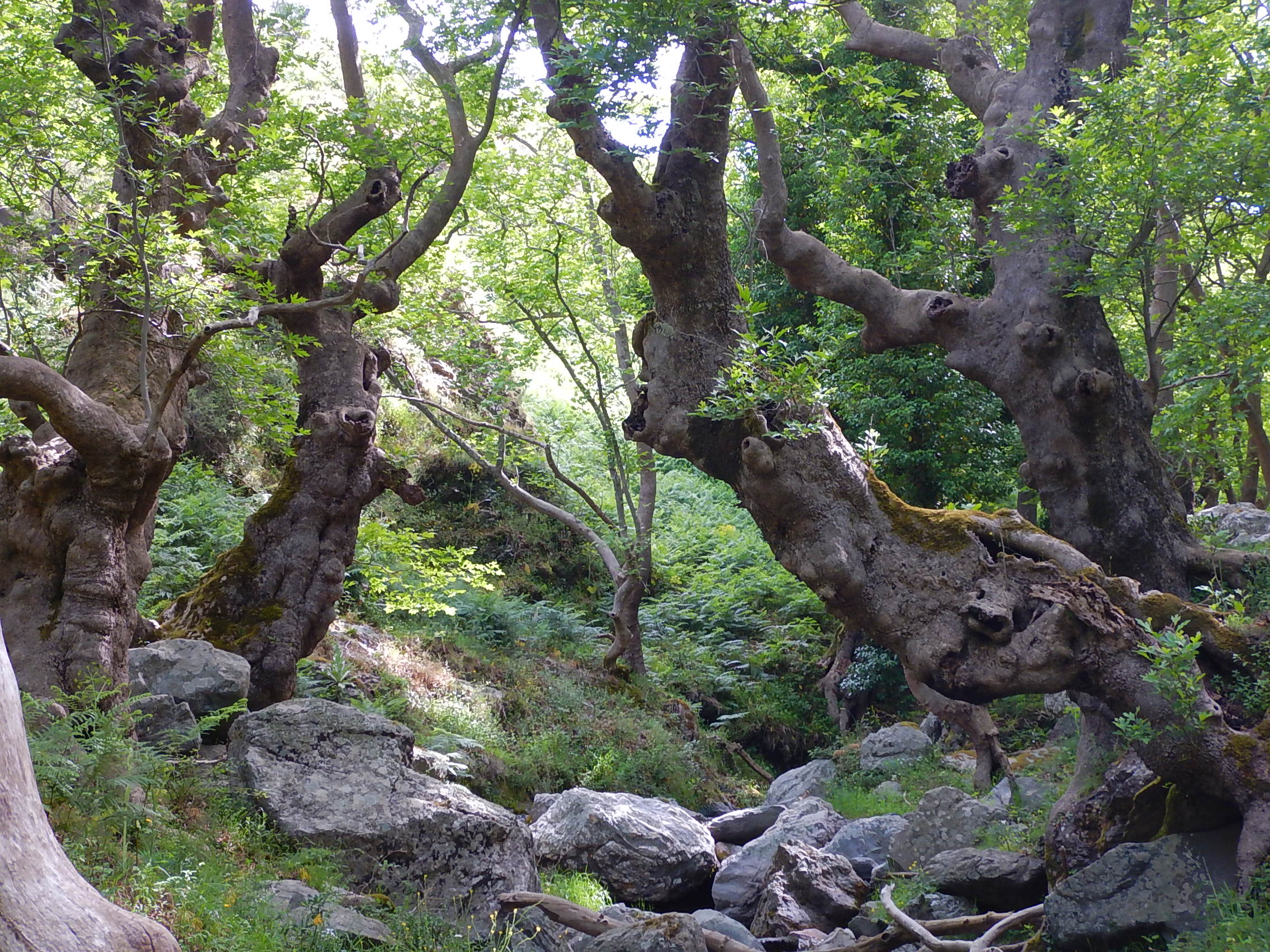
The Giants' Gorge of the Patrì creek in Fondachelli-Fantina

== Description ==
Fondachelli-Fantina is a comune (municipality) in the Metropolitan City of Messina, Sicily between Novara and Francavilla di Sicilia, in the southern Peloritani mountains. It rises on an inland area and is 604 metres (1,982 ft) above sea level, around the bed of the Patrì river, the mythical Longanus river of the ancient times that arises in the valley. The community borders the municipalities of Antillo and Rodì Milici. The main mountains of this valley are Montagna Grande, Rocca Salvatesta, Montagna di Vernà, Pizzo Russa, Rocche di Durante and Pizzo Vento that form also an astronomic calendar where is possible to observe the equinox. It is composed by more than 15 little villages spread on the slopes of Peloritani mountains along the Patrì river whose the most populated are Rubino, Evangelisti, Chiesa, Figheri and Fantina. It is 81 km from Catania, 73 kilometres (45 mi) from Messina, 129 kilometres (80 mi) from Syracuse, and 235 kilometres (146 mi) from Palermo.

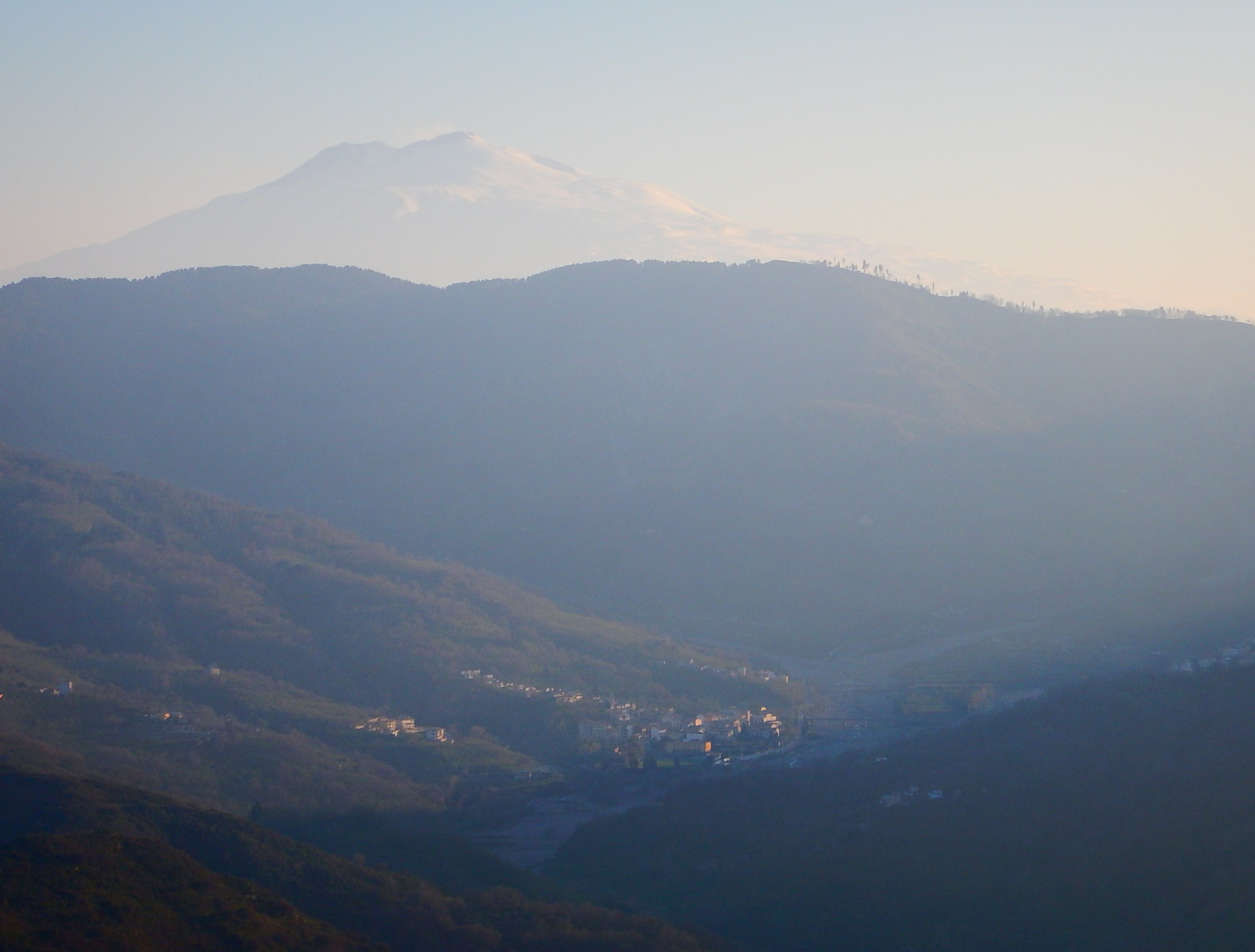
The Fondachelli Fantina Valley around the Patrì creek

Developed from a number of rural hamlets in the territory of Novara di Sicilia, the collective community attained autonomous status in 1950 and called itself Fondachelli-Fantina, a name derived from Fondaci (Arabic funduq : "stores" or "warehouses") and Fantinia (Latin infans: "child"). It is historically important as one of the last Sicilian municipalities where Gallo-Sicilian survives as a spoken dialect making the town a linguistic island.

== History ==
The area now known as Fondachelli-Fantina always has been quite isolated. Even today, the long, winding road connecting the municipality to the Ionian coast can become impassable during the winter. However, this insularity has aided in preserving the Gallo-Sicilian language, a remnant of the period during the Swabian-Norman domination (1061–1266) when people from Northern Italy migrated to the area.

The town passed into the hands of the Palizzi family, who held it until 1353, when the Gioiemi of Novara took possession. Between 1720 and 1880, the territory endured heavy mining activity. The 26 scattered mines used a great quantity of lumber, destabilized the land and degraded the mountains. Additionally, continuous flooding had devastating consequences. Major floods in 1880, 1951, 1958 and 1973 continued the territorial degradation.

However, administrative autonomy from Novara di Sicilia on 20 June 1950 gave Fondachelli-Fantina legislative powers and control of public works as well as financial means to begin reforestation efforts and build roads, houses and aqueducts.

== Culture ==
As of March 2009, the population of Fondachelli-Fantina was 1,234 with a density of 30 inhabitants per square kilometer. Its economy is based primarily on livestock breeding (cattle, pigs, goats and sheep) and the cultivation of grains, dried fruit, wine grapes and wood, the Maiorchino is the cheese most famous produced in the zone. On 22 June and the second Friday of July each year, the town hosts cattle fairs which are attended by exhibitors from other communities.

The town has four schools: one pre-school, two primary schools, and one secondary school. Community churches (Messina diocese) include S. Maria della Provvidenza and Santi Angeli Custodi ES Giuseppi. The community celebrates 3 unique feast days: the Feast of the Patron of the town Santissimi Angeli Custodi on the second Sunday of July, the feast of Saint Joseph the first Sunday after mid August and the Feast of Madonna della Provvidenza (Our Lady of Providence) on 8 September.

A war memorial ("Monument to the Fallen") is in the town centre on the Piazza santissimi Angeli Custodi, where social and sporting events are held. The Monument to Padre Pio is on via XX Giugno 1950.
