= Strait of Messina =

Strait between Calabria and Sicilia, Italy

- Stretto di Messina (Italian); Strittu di Missina (Sicilian)
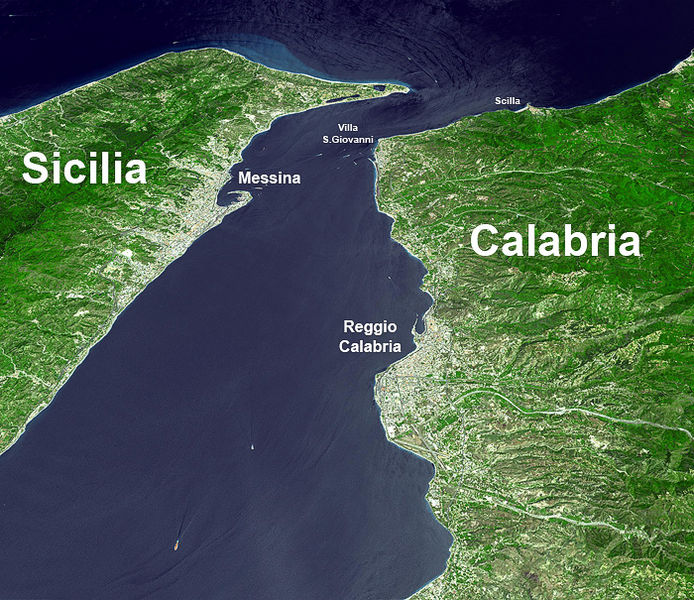
- Satellite photo of the Strait of Messina with names. NASA image.

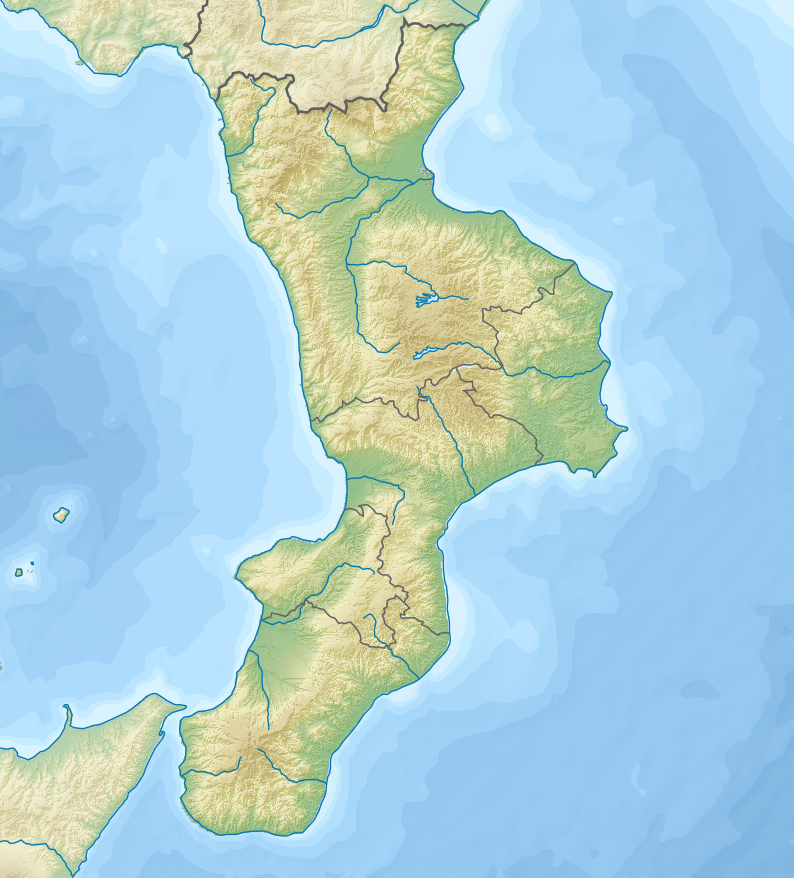
- Location within Sicily Location within Calabria Location within Italy Location within Mediterranean
- Location: Tyrrhenian Sea–Ionian Sea
- Coordinates: 38°14′45″N 15°37′57″E
- Type: Strait
- Basin countries: Italy
- Min. width: 3.1 km (1.9 mi)
- Settlements: Messina, Villa San Giovanni, Reggio Calabria, Scilla, Calabria

The Strait of Messina is a narrow strait between the eastern tip of Sicily (Punta del Faro) and the western tip of Calabria (Punta Pezzo) in Southern Italy. It connects the Tyrrhenian Sea to the north with the Ionian Sea to the south, within the central Mediterranean. At its narrowest point, between Torre Faro and Villa San Giovanni, it is 3.1 km (1.9 mi) wide. At the city of Messina, it is 5.1 km (3.2 mi) wide. The strait's maximum depth is about 250 m (820 ft).

The strait has strong tidal currents that create a unique marine ecosystem. The rock in the town of Scilla, Calabria at the north of the strait and a natural whirlpool in the northern portion of the strait have been linked to the Greek legend of Scylla and Charybdis. In some circumstances, the mirage of Fata Morgana can be observed when looking at Sicily from Calabria. With its bottleneck shape, it is also a compulsory point of transit in the migration of many bird species.

== Bird migration ==
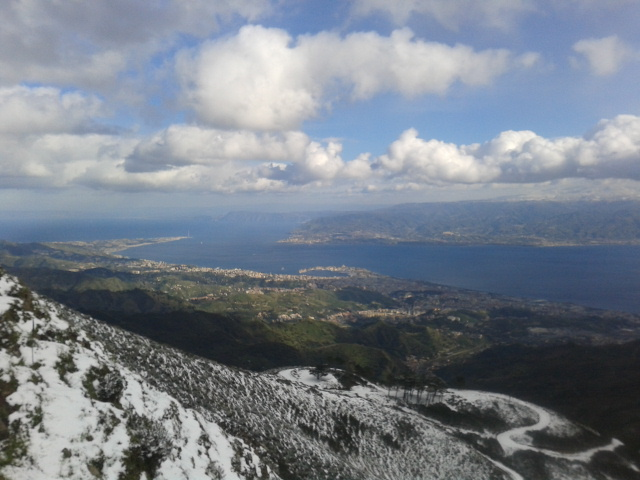
The strait seen from Mount Dinnammare, Peloritani

The Strait of Messina is a focal point in the migrations of birds every year, who mainly cross the strait to reach their breeding grounds in northern Europe. Due to this form of bottleneck more than 300 species are recorded in the area, which is a major European hot spot for raptors, with a record of 35,000 in one spring.

Among them the European honey buzzard and the marsh harrier are the most frequent, and species like Bonelli's eagle and Egyptian vulture are less frequent but regular. In the coastal salt lakes of the Strait of Messina species like glossy ibis, flamingos and black-winged stilt stop to rest. The site is also favorable for observing storks. The Monte Dinnammare and the other Peloritani mountains overlooking the Strait are a natural theatre for birdwatching.

== Marine life ==
Due to its unique hydrogeological conditions the Strait of Messina has high levels of biodiversity and multiple endemic species. In its waters there is a strong presence of deep sea fish like the Sloane's viperfish which, due to the particular and peculiar currents of the strait, are occasionally found stranded on the shore at sunrise. The strait is also an important point of migration of many species of fish in the Mediterranean Sea.

== Transportation ==
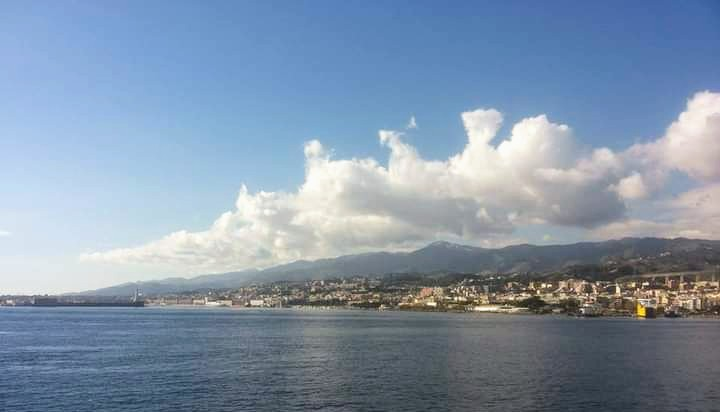
The Strait of Messina and the Messina panorama as viewed from the ferry

A ferry service connects Messina on Sicily with the mainland at Villa San Giovanni, which lies several kilometers north of the large city of Reggio Calabria; the ferries hold the cars (carriages) of the mainline train service between Palermo and Naples. There is also a hydrofoil service between Messina and Reggio Calabria.

=== Bridge plans ===
For decades, the possibility of building a bridge across the Messina Strait has been under discussion. In 2006, under Prime Minister Romano Prodi the project was cancelled. In 2009, as part of a massive new public works program, Silvio Berlusconi's government announced that plans to construct the Strait of Messina Bridge had been fully revived, pledging €1.3 billion as a contribution to its estimated cost of €6.1 billion Some 3.3 km long and 60 m wide, the bridge would be supported by two 382 m pillars, each higher than the Empire State Building, and accommodate six freeway lanes, a railway (for up to 200 trains a day), and two walkways.

Supporters perceive the bridge as an opportunity for job creation and potential for an increase in tourism to the island. Opponents see it as an ecological disaster, a structure at risk due to especially strong winds and earthquakes (the area having an intense seismic record), and a potential increase in Sicilian and Calabrian organized crime. Berlusconi claimed in 2009 that work would be completed by 2016, although in February 2013, the project was cancelled again.

Italian prime minister Giorgia Meloni revived the project with a decree in 2022. The government gave it final approval in August of 2025. Construction is set to start in 2025 and to be completed by 2032. Opponents of the project cited an estimate that of the 4.3 million birds that fly through the strait annually, 17–46% risked colliding with the proposed bridge.

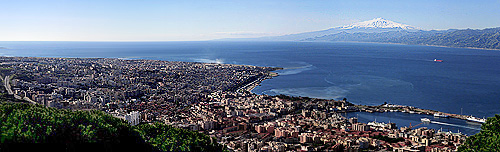
The strait seen from the hill of "Pentimele", near Reggio Calabria. In the distance at right is the snow-covered volcano Mount Etna.

== Pylons ==
In 1957, a 220 kV overhead power line was built across the Strait of Messina. Its pylons are among the highest in the world. This power line has since been replaced by a submarine power cable, but the pylons remain and are protected as historical monuments.

On 10 July 2024, Estonian athlete Jaan Roose crossed the Strait of Messina on a slackline spanned between the two Messina pylons. He surpassed the previous longest slackline walk of 2,710 meters and completed a distance of 3,600 meters.

== See also ==
- Strait of Messina Bridge
- Between Scylla and Charybdis
