= Peloritani =

Mountain in Italy

Coordinates: 38°03′N 15°20′E

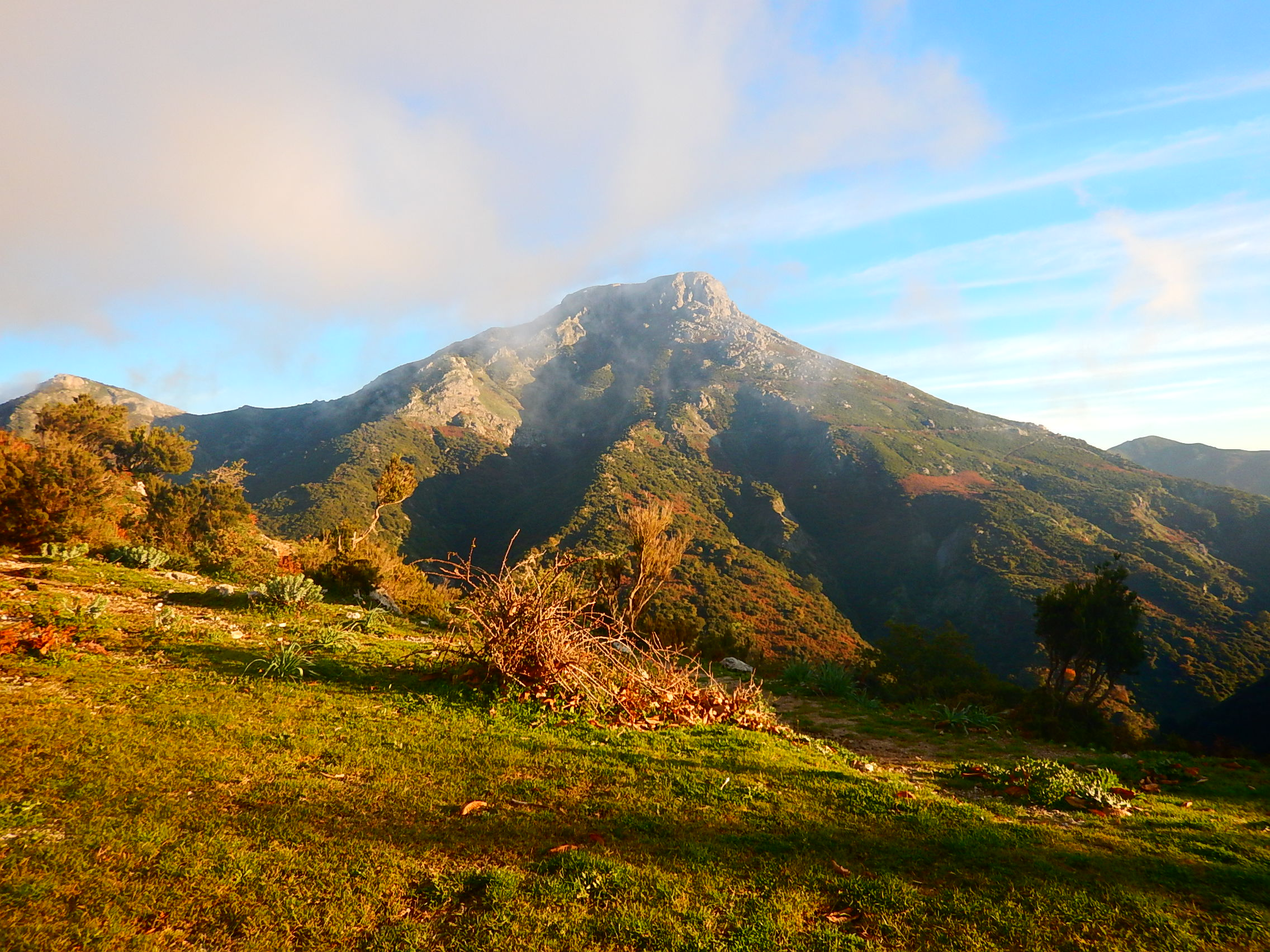
The Mount Scuderi, with its typical flat dolomitic peak

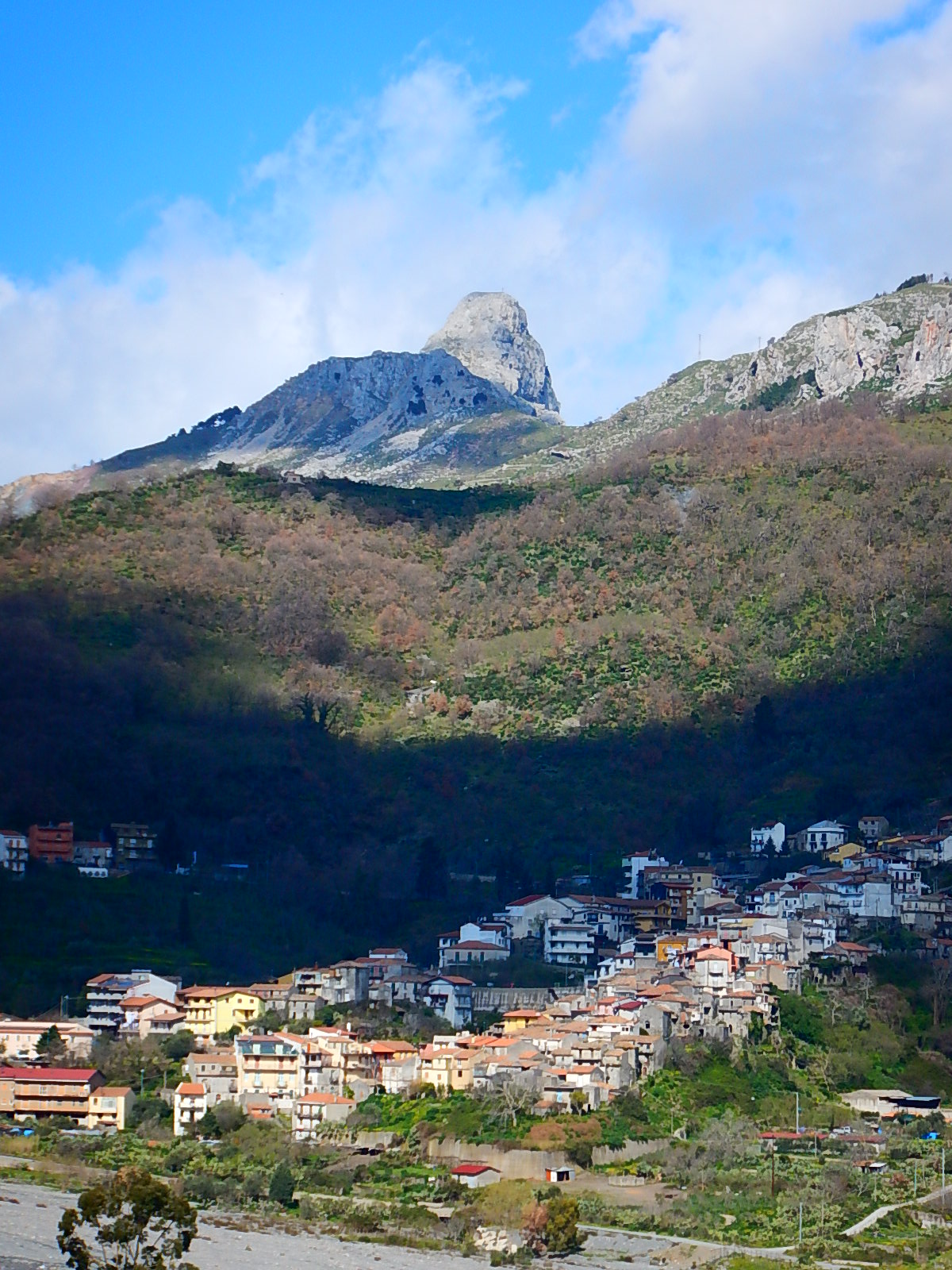
The Rocca di Novara dominates Fondachelli-Fantina valley.

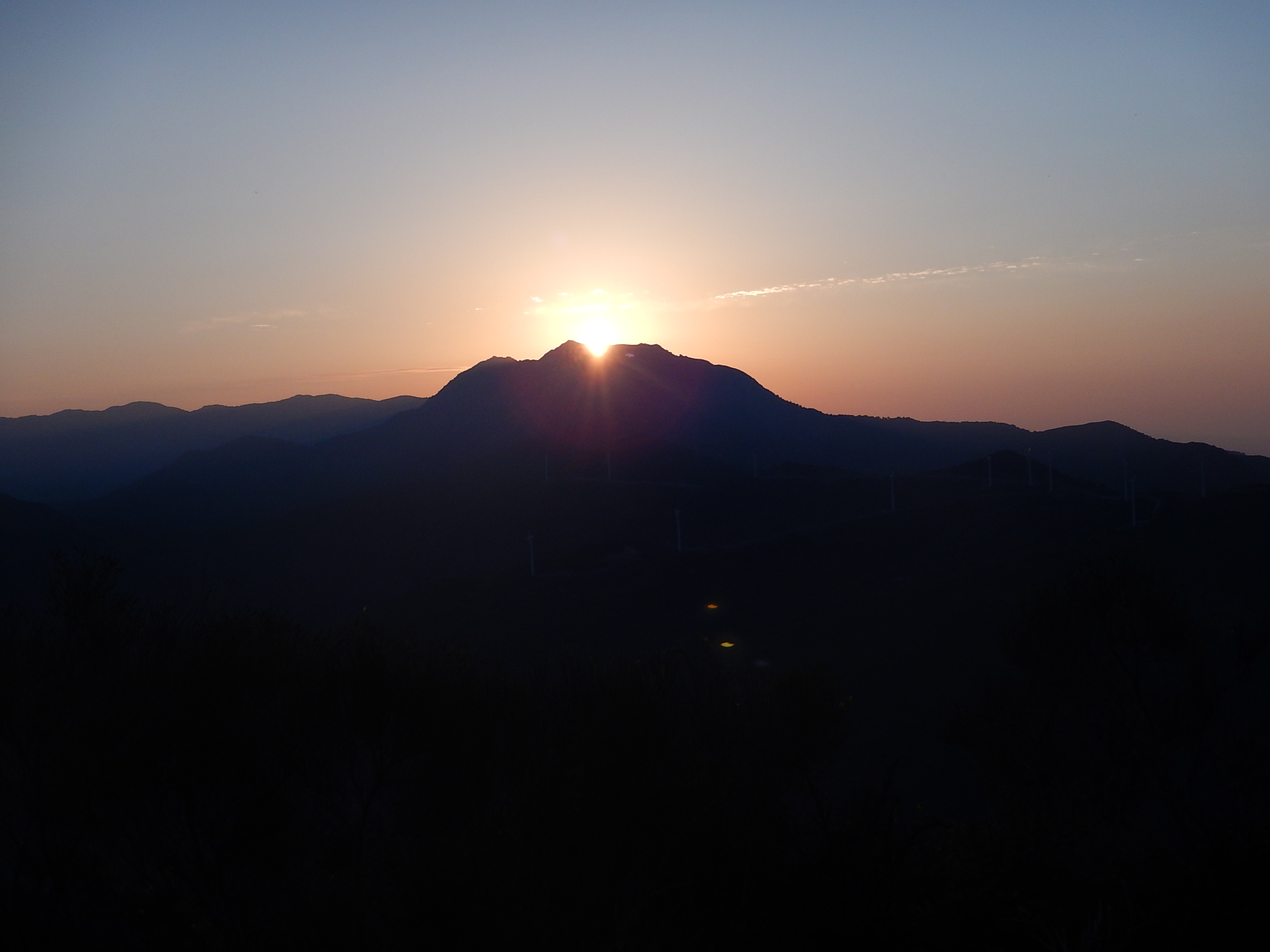
in front of the Pizzo di Vernà from Fondachelli-Fantina

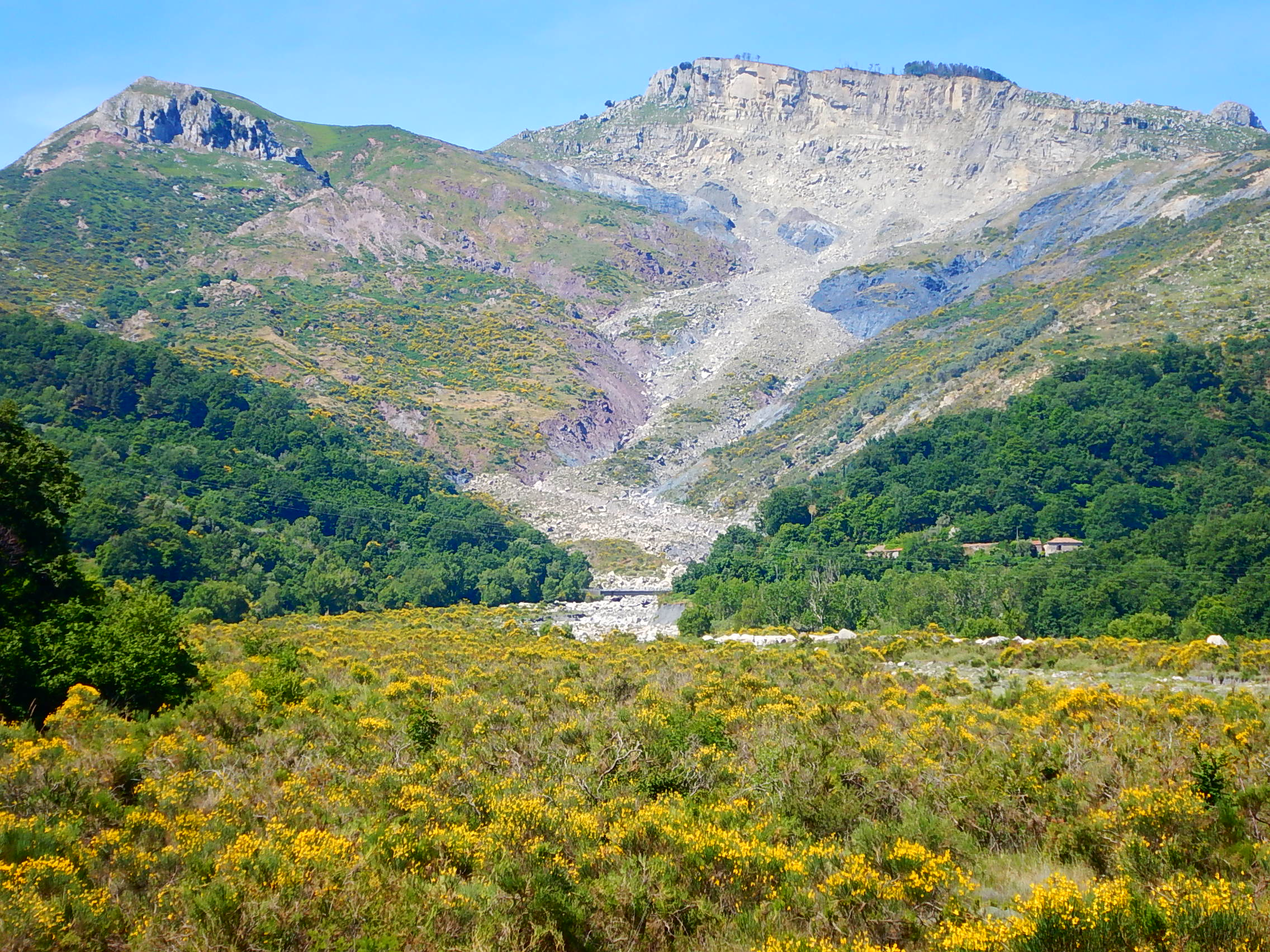
the Ritagli di Lecca from Fondachelli Fantina

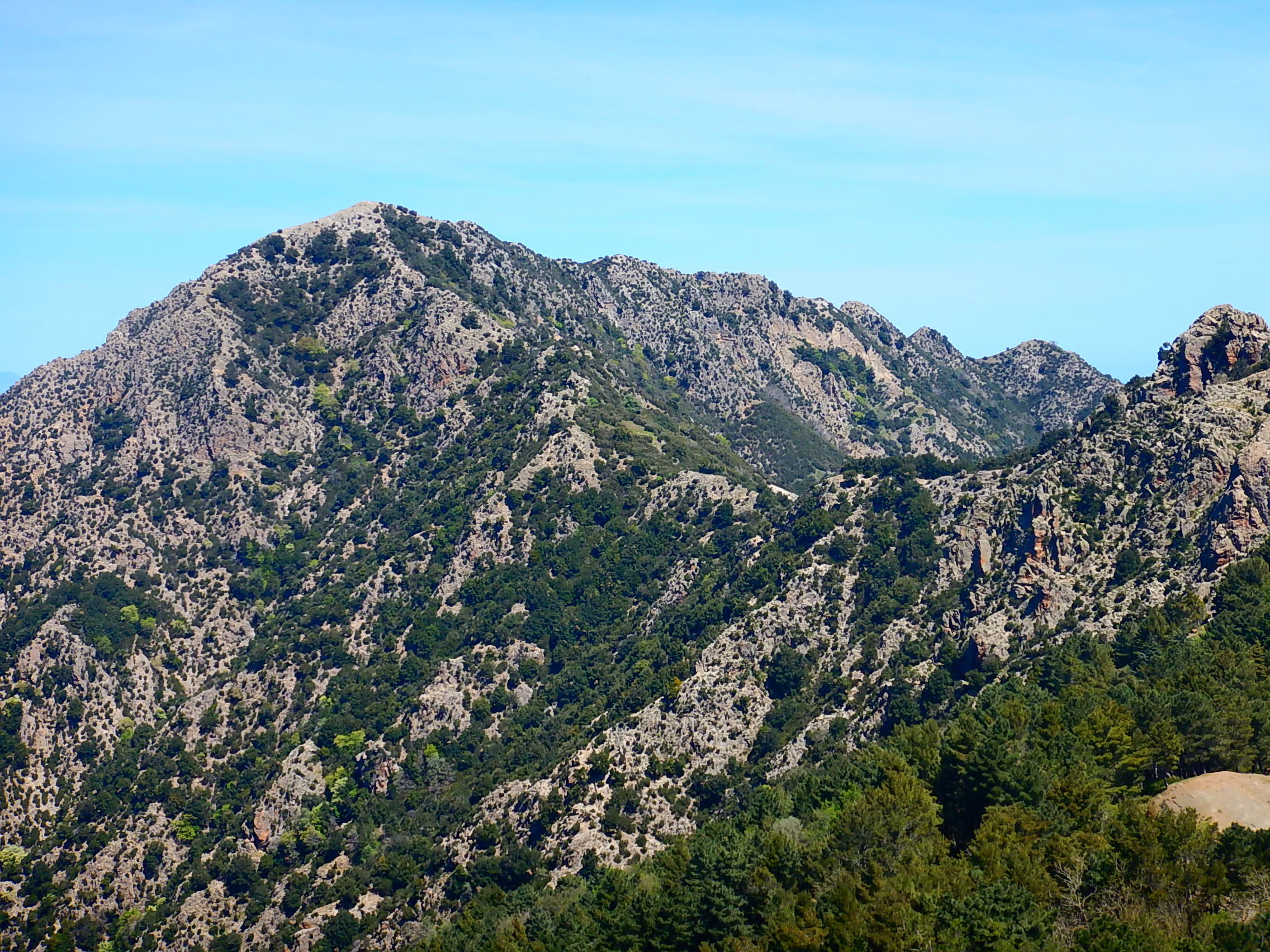
The mountain Pizzo Russa lies in the territories of Fondachelli-Fantina and Novara di Sicilia

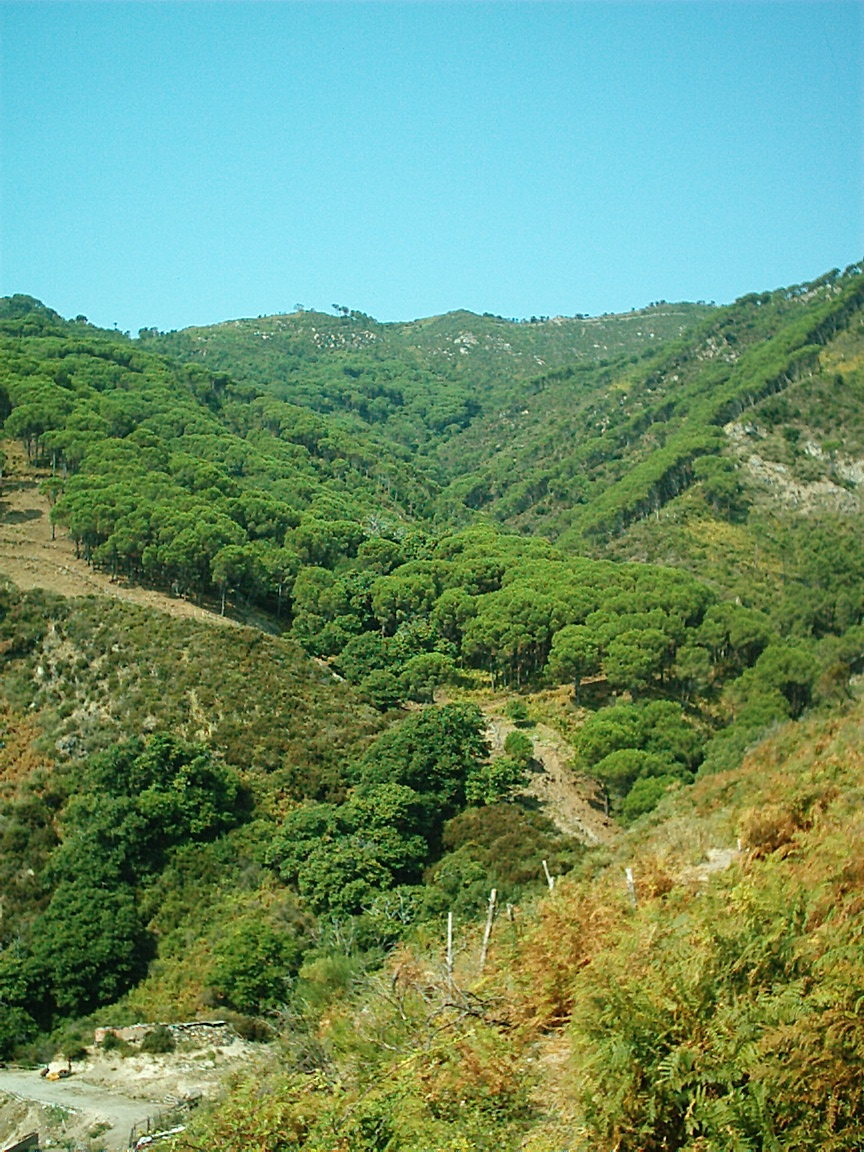
A pine forest in the territory of Mili San Pietro, in the comune of Messina

The Peloritani (Sicilian: Piluritani, Italian: Monti Peloritani) are a mountain range of north-eastern Sicily, in southern Italy, extending for some 65 km (40 mi) from Capo Peloro to the Nebrodi Mountains. On the north and east they are bordered by the Tyrrhenian and Ionian Seas respectively, and on the south by the Alcantara River .

The highest peaks are the Montagna Grande (1,374 m, 4,508 ft), the Rocca di Novara (1,340 m, 4,400 ft), the Pizzo di Vernà (1,287 m, 4,222 ft), the Monte Poverello (1,279 m, 4,196 ft) and the Monte Scuderi (1,253 m, 4,111 ft). The range is made up of a long series of peaks, with an average height of 800–1,000 m (2,600–3,300 ft), intermingled with ridges and ravines. The deep gorges house numerous streams that create the typical rivers of this land called fiumare, often full of deprises in their inferior flow. The most common rocks are of igneous and metamorphic origin. Sandstone soils are also present. Of unusual origin are the megaliths rocks of the Argimusco plateau. Historical-Archaeological Relations and Toponymic Analogies

between the Ausonian-Auruncan Lazio and the Tyrrhenian-Peloritan Area1. The Scientific Framework and Archaeogenetic EvidenceRecent developments in international archaeogenetic research have shed new light on the population dynamics of protohistoric Italy. A fundamental study published in September 2021 in the scientific journal Science Advances — conducted by a multinational team coordinated by the Max Planck Institute for the Science of Human History in Jena and the University of Florence — has demonstrated substantial genetic homogeneity among the main populations of the Iron Age in central Italy (including Etruscans and Latins) . Biogeographic data indicate a common ancestral root linked to migrations from the Eurasian steppes during the Bronze Age, genetically unifying the peoples of the central Tyrrhenian area, historically associated with the Ausonians and Aurunci lineages. The Late Bronze Age Migrations to the Strait of Messina: This biological and cultural substratum perfectly corresponds chronologically and materially with the great protohistoric migrations. Between 1270 BC and 1250 BC (the Recent and Late Bronze Age phase), groups of Ausonian origin began a descent along the Tyrrhenian axis until they reached the Strait of Messina and the Aeolian archipelago. Archaeological evidence describes this phenomenon through the sudden appearance of the so-called "Ausonian I" and "Ausonian II" cultures, characterized by housing structures and ceramic production with a clear peninsular (Apennine and Sub-Apennine) influence, abruptly superimposed on pre-existing local cultures (such as that of Milazzese). Topographic, Anthropic, and Odonymic Similarities: The Mela District and the Ausoni-Aurunci Mountains. Beyond the biological and archaeological data, there is an extraordinary convergence between the anthropic geography of southern Lazio and that of the Tyrrhenian coast of the province of Messina, specifically around the Peloritani mountain system. Landscape Morphology: The geomorphological structure of the Peloritani villages faithfully mirrors that of the Ausoni and Aurunci Mountains. Hilltop towns such as Campodimele (LT), perched on a karst spur overlooking the valleys below, find their exact structural and functional counterpart in Messina villages such as Santa Lucia del Mela, Pace del Mela, and San Filippo del Mela. Both settlement models respond to the same protohistoric and economic need: a defensive hilltop fortress combined with the integrated exploitation of mountain resources (silvo-pastoral) and fertile coastal plains. Toponymic Correspondences (Hydronymy): The millennia-long persistence of the hydronymic and toponymic root linked to "Mela" or "Melo" in both geographical areas suggests a "geography of memory." The Mela River, which flows through the plain between Milazzo and Barcellona Pozzo di Gotto, and the related hilltop urban centers retain a linguistic root mirroring that of the Lazio village of Campodimele (Campus de Melle). This linguistic and geographical continuity testifies to how the protohistoric settlers projected the toponymy of their homeland onto the new settlement territories. Cultural Cooperation Prospects: Institutional Twinning Hypothesis. In light of these close anthropological, geographical, and archaeological interconnections, the idea of promoting an institutional twinning and cultural cooperation protocol between the Park Authorities/Mountain Communities of the Ausoni and Aurunci Mountains (Lazio Region) and the corresponding territorial management bodies of the Peloritani Mountains (Metropolitan City of Messina) appears scientifically sound and culturally fruitful. This synergy not only aims to celebrate a remote and shared identity—handed down over the centuries and still evident in the structure of the villages and in their agro-pastoral affinities—but also aims to establish a permanent channel for scientific, tourist, and anthropological exchange, aimed at enhancing the historical and archaeological heritage shared by these two areas of the Tyrrhenian Sea.

Vegetation includes holm oak, oak, cork oak, beech, pine and chestnut, which once formed large forests but are now, mostly due to human presence, reduced to sparse woods so that the landscape is largely steppe-like. Several pine woods have been reconstituted by the local authorities since the 1950s. An ancient path, Dorsale dei Peloritani, runs along the ridge line from Monte Dinnammare above the Strait of Messina to the Rocca di Novara.
