= Garganica =

Breed of goat

- Conservation status: FAO (2007): endangered
- Country of origin: Italy
- Distribution: Gargano promontory; province of Foggia; southern Apennines
- Standard: MIPAAF
- Use: milk, meat

Traits
- Weight: Male: 65 kg; Female: 50 kg
- Height: Male: 85 cm; Female: 75 cm
- Coat: glossy black with reddish lights
- Face colour: black
- Horn status: horned in both sexes
- Goat; Capra aegagrus hircus

The Garganica is a breed of domestic goat which originated on the Gargano promontory in the Puglia region of southern Italy. From there it has spread to other parts of Puglia and to neighbouring regions.

== History ==
The Garganica is indigenous to the Gargano, and derives from cross-breeding of local animals with goats imported from western Europe, probably at the same time as the importation of Merino sheep that led to the formation of the Gentile di Puglia sheep breed.

The Garganica is one of the eight autochthonous Italian goat breeds for which a genealogical herdbook is kept by the Associazione Nazionale della Pastorizia, the Italian national association of sheep-breeders. The breed standard was approved in 1976. Numbers have fallen sharply in recent years; In 1870 there were 33725 head; by 2002 this had fallen to 18000. The conservation status of the breed was listed as "endangered" by the Food and Agriculture Organization of the United Nations in 2007. In 2008 the total population was estimated at 3000, of which 511 were registered in the herdbook. At the end of 2013 the registered population was 773.

== Characteristics ==
The animals are of medium height and not heavy: adult males typically weigh 65 kg, and females 50 kg. The heads are rather small and adults have long, coarse black or dark chestnut hair. The skins of the kids are prized for their curly, raven-black hair.

The breed is noted for its toughness and is well suited to being raised in a wild state in very difficult habitats.

== Use ==
The milk yield of the Garganica is reported as 120 litres in 180 days for primiparous nannies, and 170 litres in 210 days for pluriparous ones, in one source; another gives a yield of 180–250 litres. The milk is used to make the traditional regional cheeses of the Gargano, including canestrato and cacioricotta del Gargano.

The meat is used to make muscisca, a traditional food of transhumant pastoralists. Strips of goat's meat are salted, flavoured with garlic, and air- or sun-dried.
