= Rocca di Novara =

Mountain in Italy

- Rocca di Salvatesta; Cervino di Sicilia
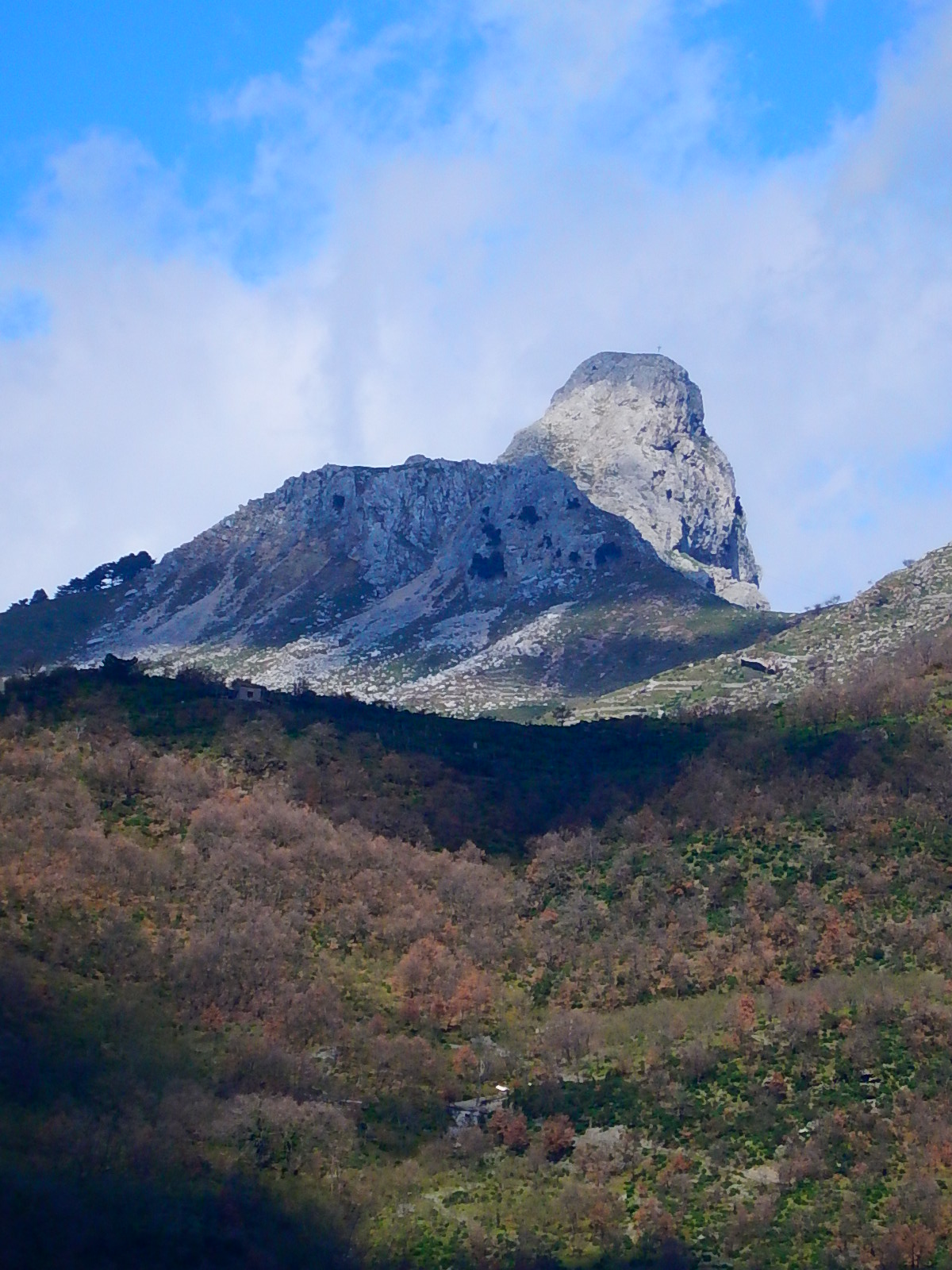
- Rocca di Novara, seen from Fondachelli-Fantina

Highest point
- Elevation: 1,340 m (4,400 ft)
- Coordinates: 37°59′42.8″N 15°08′46″E

Geography
- Location within Sicily
- Location: Sicily, Italy
- Parent range: Peloritani

The Rocca di Novara (also called “Rocca di Salvatesta” and “Cervino di Sicilia”) is a peak in the Peloritani mountains, situated in the northeastern part of Sicily, between the territories of Novara di Sicilia and Fondachelli-Fantina from where trails start to its top. It has an elevation of 1,340 meters above sea level. It resembles a Dolomites peak and because of this and the panoramic view from its summit it is a popular mountain with tourists. A summit cross with a figure of Jesus lies at its top. An annual pilgrimage to the summit is made by Christians on 18 August to celebrate a mass. Pits used by ancient people to collect snow for the summer remain on its slopes. The walls of the mountain resemble a human face from a particular point of view and the ancient legend of buried treasure on it, discoverable by those who pass a series of trials, gives it an air of mystery. The mountain has been granted Site of Community Importance status.

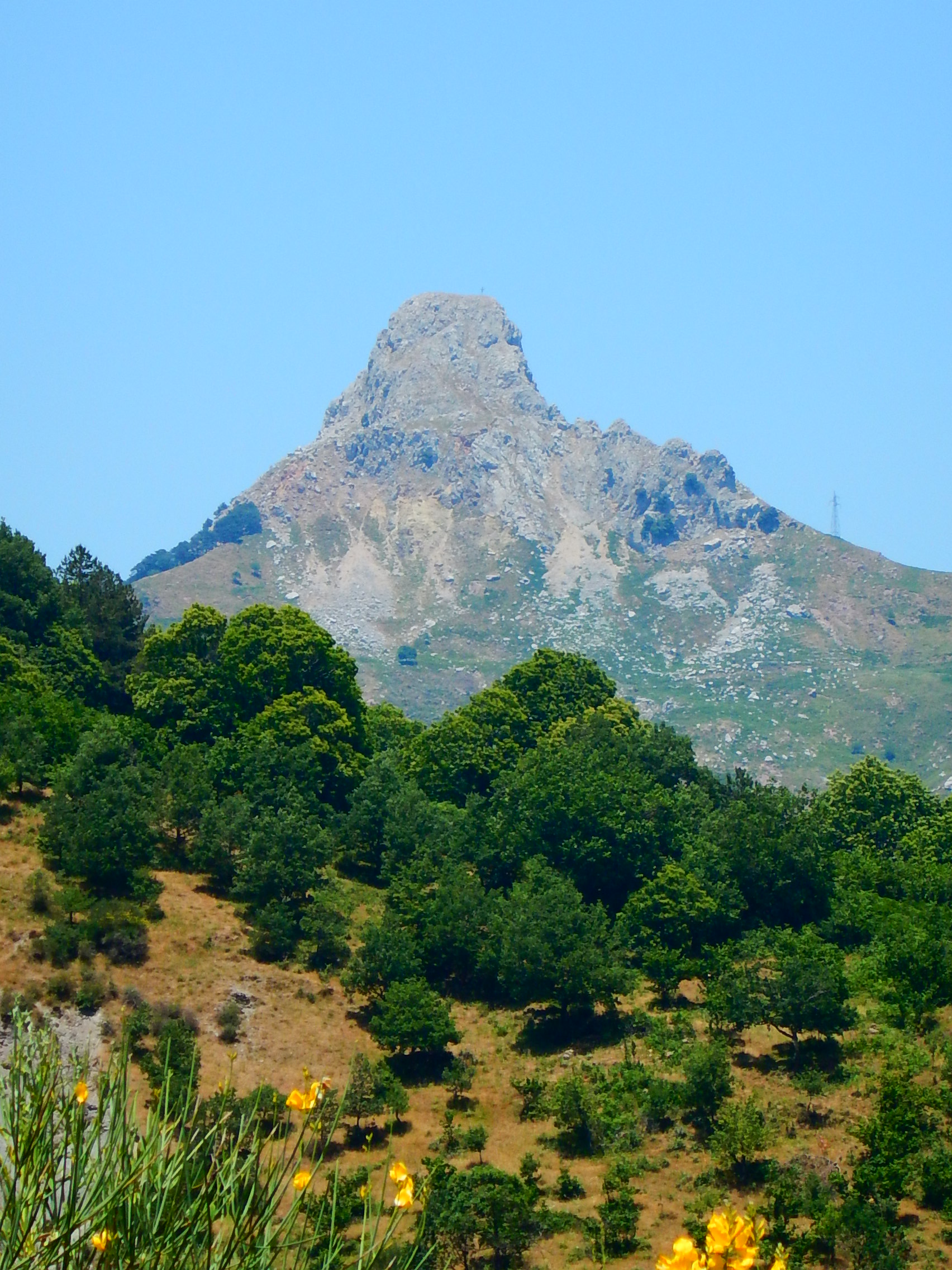
The Mountain seen from the high Patrì river

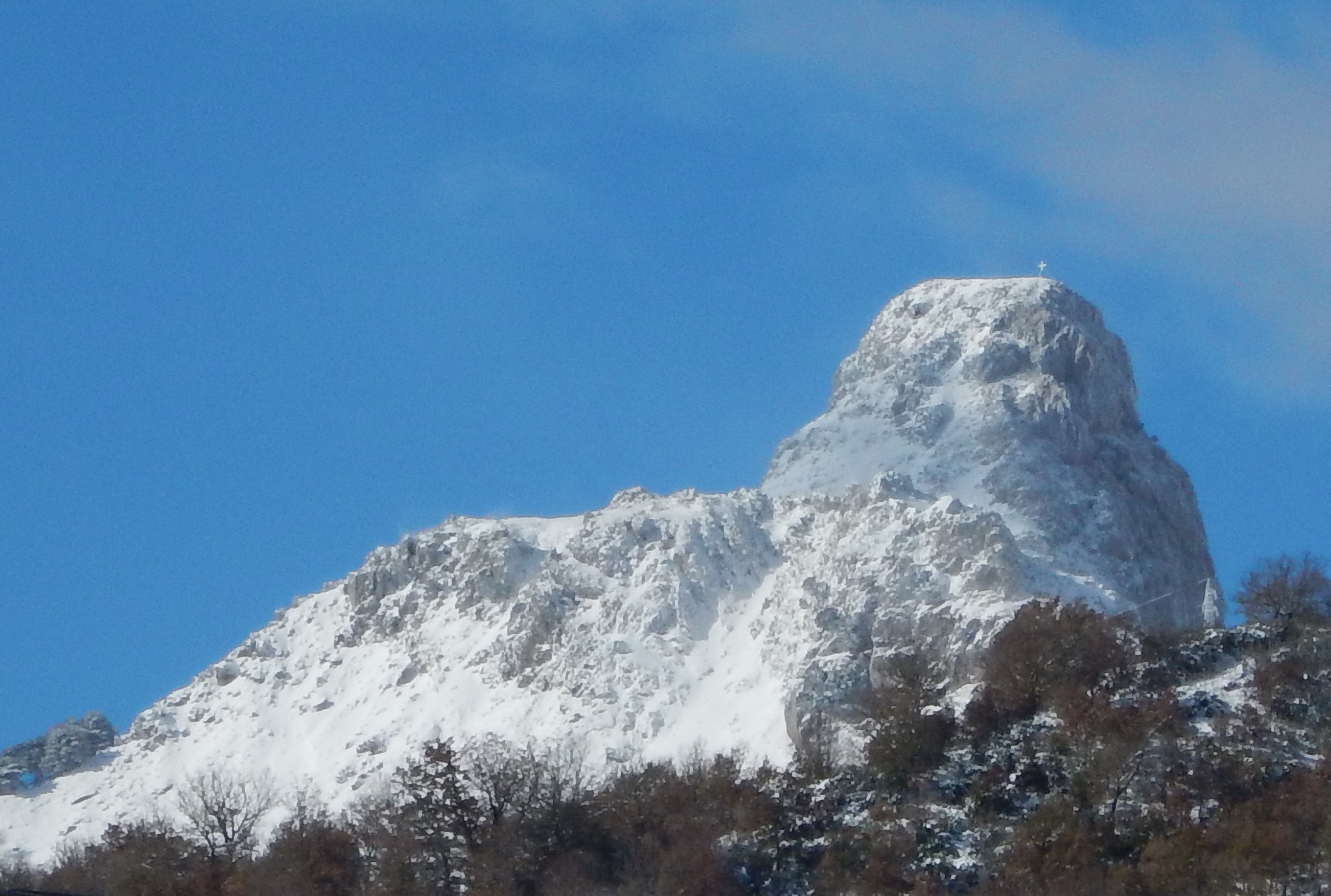
white Rocca Salvatesta, 1340 m

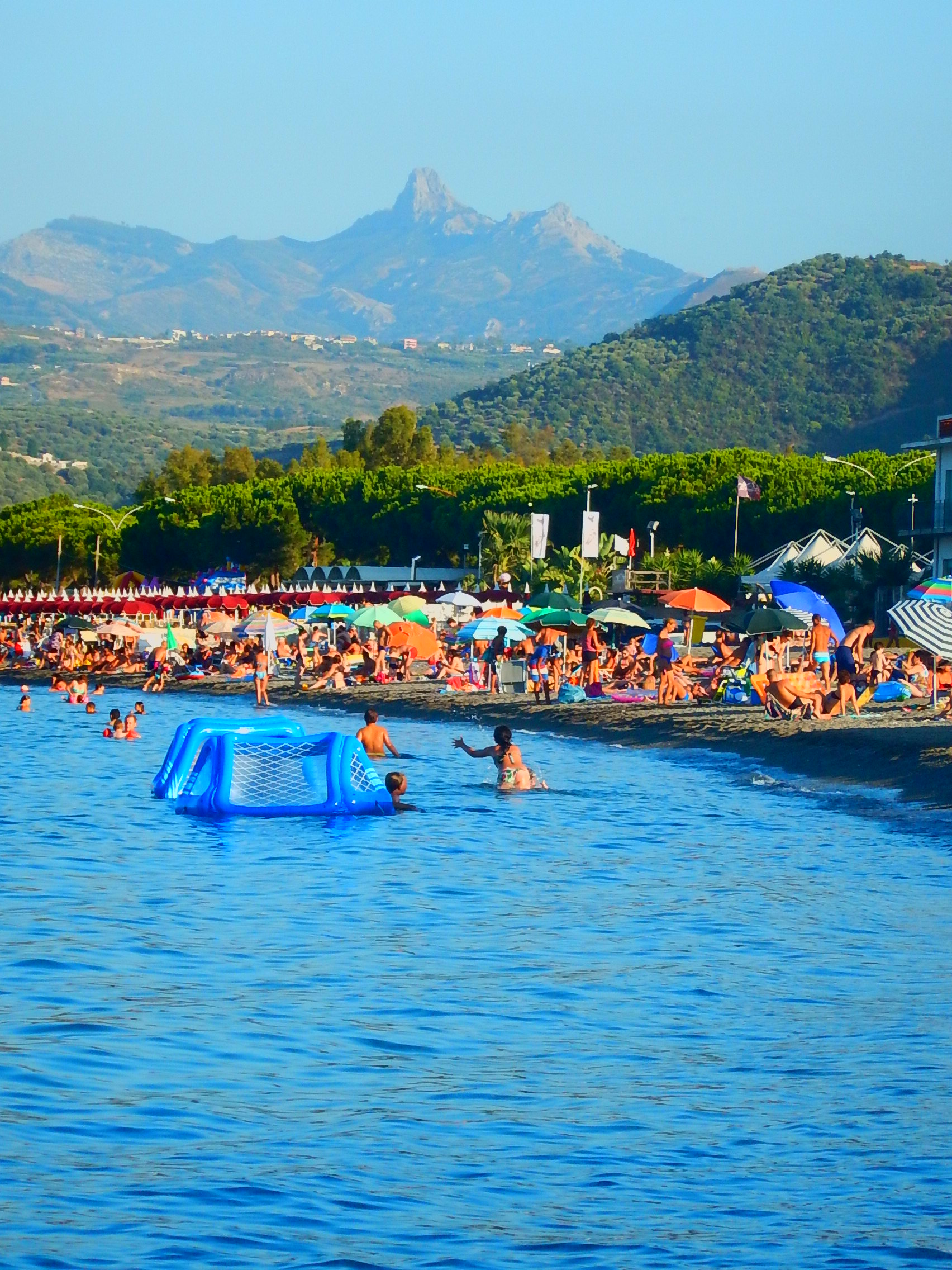
Rocca Salvatesta north side seen from nature reserve of Marinello
