= Ciociara Grigia =

Italian breed of goat

- Conservation status: FAO (2007): endangered
- Other names: Grigia Ciociara
- Country of origin: Italy
- Distribution: Province of Frosinone; Province of Rome
- Standard: MIPAAF
- Use: milk

Traits
- Weight: Male: 75–85 kg; Female: 45–55 kg
- Horn status: horned or hornless in both sexes
- Goat; Capra aegagrus hircus

The Ciociara Grigia or Grigia Ciociara is an indigenous breed of domestic goat from Lazio in central Italy. It takes its name from the Ciociaria, the area around Frosinone. It is thought to have originated in the area of the Monti Aurunci and the Monti Ausoni. It is raised in those mountains, in the Monti Lepini, and in the Val Comino. Because of the transhumant management of the herds it has also diffused into some neighbouring areas of Campania and Abruzzo. It is one of the forty-three autochthonous Italian goat breeds of limited distribution for which a herdbook is kept by the Associazione Nazionale della Pastorizia, the Italian national association of sheep- and goat-breeders.

At the end of 2013 the registered population was 674.
