= List of Swiss goat breeds =

This is a list of the Swiss breeds of goat, with various names used for them in that country:

International name	French	German	Italian	Image
Appenzell Goat	Chèvre d'Appenzell	Appenzellerziege	Capra d'Appenzello	
Capra Grigia	Chèvre grise des montagnes "Capra Grigia"	Graue Bergziege	Capra Grigia	
Capra Sempione	Capra Sempione	Simplongeiss; Simplergeiss; Gletschergeiss	Capra Sempione	
Chamois-coloured Goat	Chèvre chamoisée	Gämsfarbige Gebirgsziege	Camosciata delle Alpi	
Grisons Striped	Chèvre grisonne à raies	Bündner Strahlenziege	Striata grigionese	
Grüenochte Geiss	Chèvre col gris	Grüenochte Geiss; Grauhalsziege; Milchenziege; Grueni	Capra dal collo grigio	
Kupferhalsziege	Chèvre col fauve	Kupferhalsziege	Capra dal collo rosso	
Nera Verzasca	Chèvre Nera Verzasca	Nera Verzascaziege	Capra Nera Verzasca	
Peacock Goat	Chèvre paon	Pfauenziege	Capra Pavone	
Saanen	Chèvre de Gessenay	Saanen or Saanenziege	Capra di Saanen	
St. Gallen Booted Goat	Chèvre bottée	Stiefelgeiss or Sardonaziege	Capra dagli stivali	
Toggenburg	Chèvre du Toggenbourg	Toggenburger	Capra del Toggenburgo	
Valais Blackneck	Chèvre col noir du Valais	Walliser Schwarzhalsziege	Capra dal collo nero del Vallese	

== Extinct breeds ==
Many Swiss goat breeds are considered to be extinct. These include:

- Bergeller Ziege
- Blenio-Valmaggiaziege or Tessiner Bergziege
- Bündneroberländer Ziege (Tavetscherziege or Disentiserziege)
- Chèvre du Val d'Illiez
- Emmentaler Ziege
- Engadiner Ziege
- Entlebucher Ziege
- Freiburger Ziege or Greyerzer Ziege
- Frutiger Ziege
- Glarner Ziege
- Jura Ziege
- Liviner Ziege or Capra di Leventina
- Oberhalbsteinerziege or Schamser Ziege
- Oberhaslerziege or Hasliziege
- Oberwalliser Bergziege
- Obwaldnerziege
- Prättigauer Ziege
- Rivieraziege
- Schwarze Bündnerziege
- Schwarzenburger Ziege or Guggisberg Ziege
- Schwyzerziege
- Simmenthaler Ziege
- Unterwaldner Ziege
- Unterwalliser Ziege
- Urnerziege
- Zürcher Ziege (Weisse Zürcher Ziege or Weisse Schweizer Ziege)

== See also ==
- List of goat breeds
- List of Swiss cattle breeds
- Agriculture in Switzerland
- Swiss cheeses and dairy products
