= Striped goat =

Striped goat usually refers to one of the following animals:

- Grisons Striped goat, a breed from Switzerland
- Peacock goat, a breed from Switzerland

It may also refer to:

- Las Chivas Rayadas (The Striped Goats), a 1962 Mexican film
