= Alpine goat =

Alpine goat may refer to:

- Alpine (American goat breed)
- British Alpine
- Oberhasli goat, formerly known as Swiss Alpines
- Mountain goat, North American wildlife only distantly related to domestic goats

== See also ==
- Chamois Coloured goat, the original Swiss breed Oberhaslis derive from
- Saanen, a solid white Swiss dairy breed developed in the Alps
- Toggenburg, a brown striped Swiss dairy breed developed in the Alps
