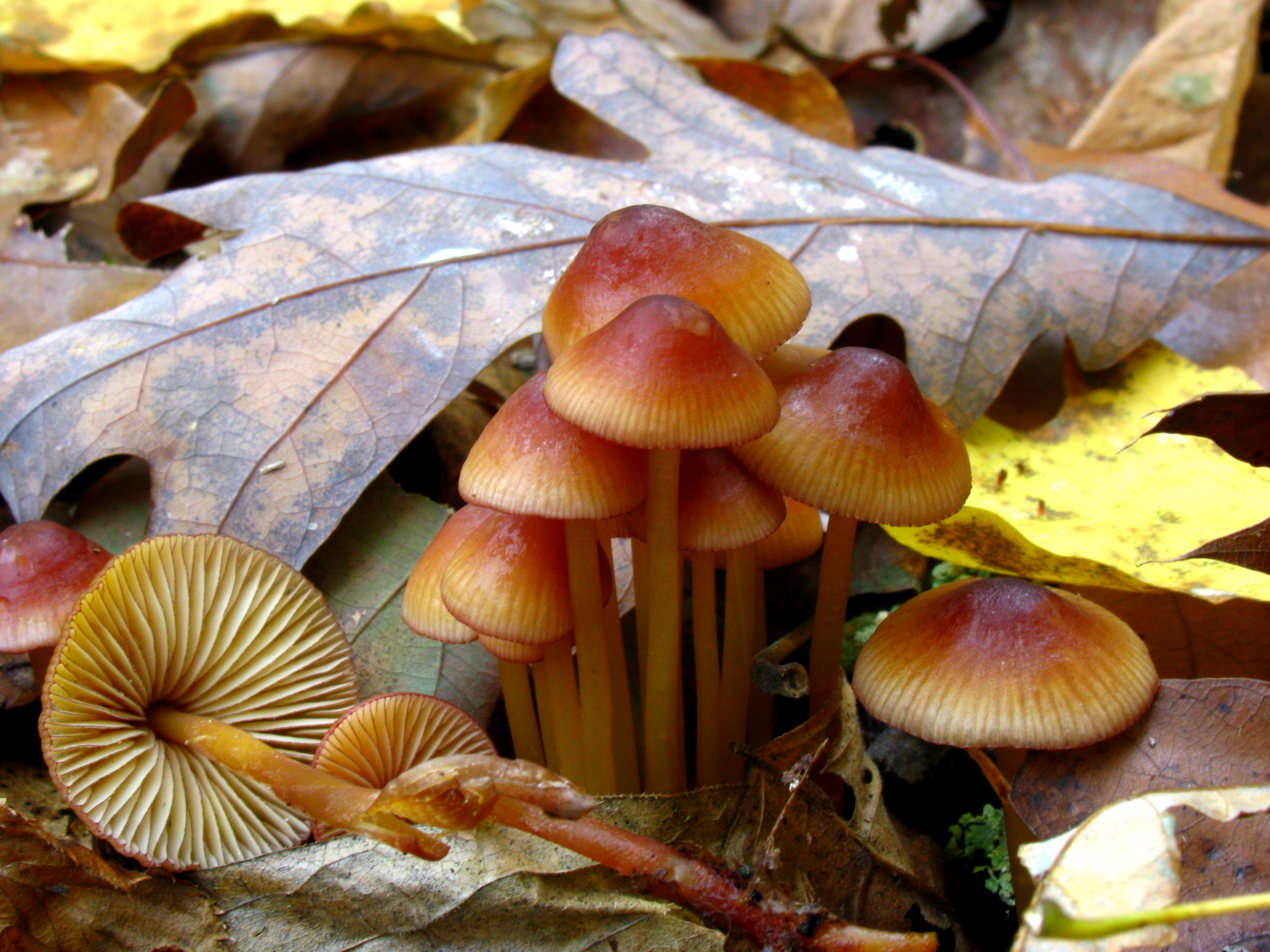
- In Strouds Run State Park, Athens, Ohio, USA

Scientific classification
- Domain: Eukaryota
- Kingdom: Fungi
- Division: Basidiomycota
- Class: Agaricomycetes
- Order: Agaricales
- Family: Mycenaceae
- Genus: Mycena
- Species: M. atkinsoniana

Binomial name
- Mycena atkinsoniana A.H.Sm. (1947)

Synonyms
- Mycena fagicola A.H.Sm. (1935)

= Mycena atkinsoniana =

Species of fungus

Mycena atkinsoniana Mycological characteristics
- Gills on hymenium
- Cap is conical or flat
- Hymenium is adnate
- Stipe is bare
- Spore print is white
- Ecology is saprotrophic
- Edibility is inedible

Mycena atkinsoniana is a species of agaric fungus in the family Mycenaceae. It is one of the so-called "bleeding mycenas" that will ooze yellow to orange juice when injured. Other distinguishing features include the upper stem surface that is decorated with tiny purplish-brown fibers, and the gills, which are pale yellow with maroon edges. The reddish-brown caps are smooth with a grooved margin, and up to 3 cm (1.2 in) wide. Mycena atkinsoniana is known from the United States and Canada, where it grows scattered or in groups on leaf litter in forests during the summer and autumn. It was originally described from collections associated with beech, but it is also frequently found under eastern North American oaks.

== Taxonomy ==
The species was first described in 1935 as Mycena fagicola by American mycologist Alexander H. Smith, based on specimens that he collected the previous year in Cross Village, Michigan. The naming, however, was illegitimate, as it had been previously used by Camille Grognot (as Mycena fagicola Grogn. apud Roumeguère published in 1885), so Smith changed the specific epithet to atkinsoniana in his 1947 monograph on North American Mycena species. Smith credited George Francis Atkinson with one of the early collections of the fungus in his 1935 species description. Mycena specialist Rudolph Arnold Maas Geesteranus agreed with Smith's decision to change the epithet, concluding that although Grognot's name was a nomen nudum (written without an adequate description), he conceded that "the possibility cannot be excluded that one day some overlooked 19th century booklet or exsiccatum will turn up containing a description".

== Description ==
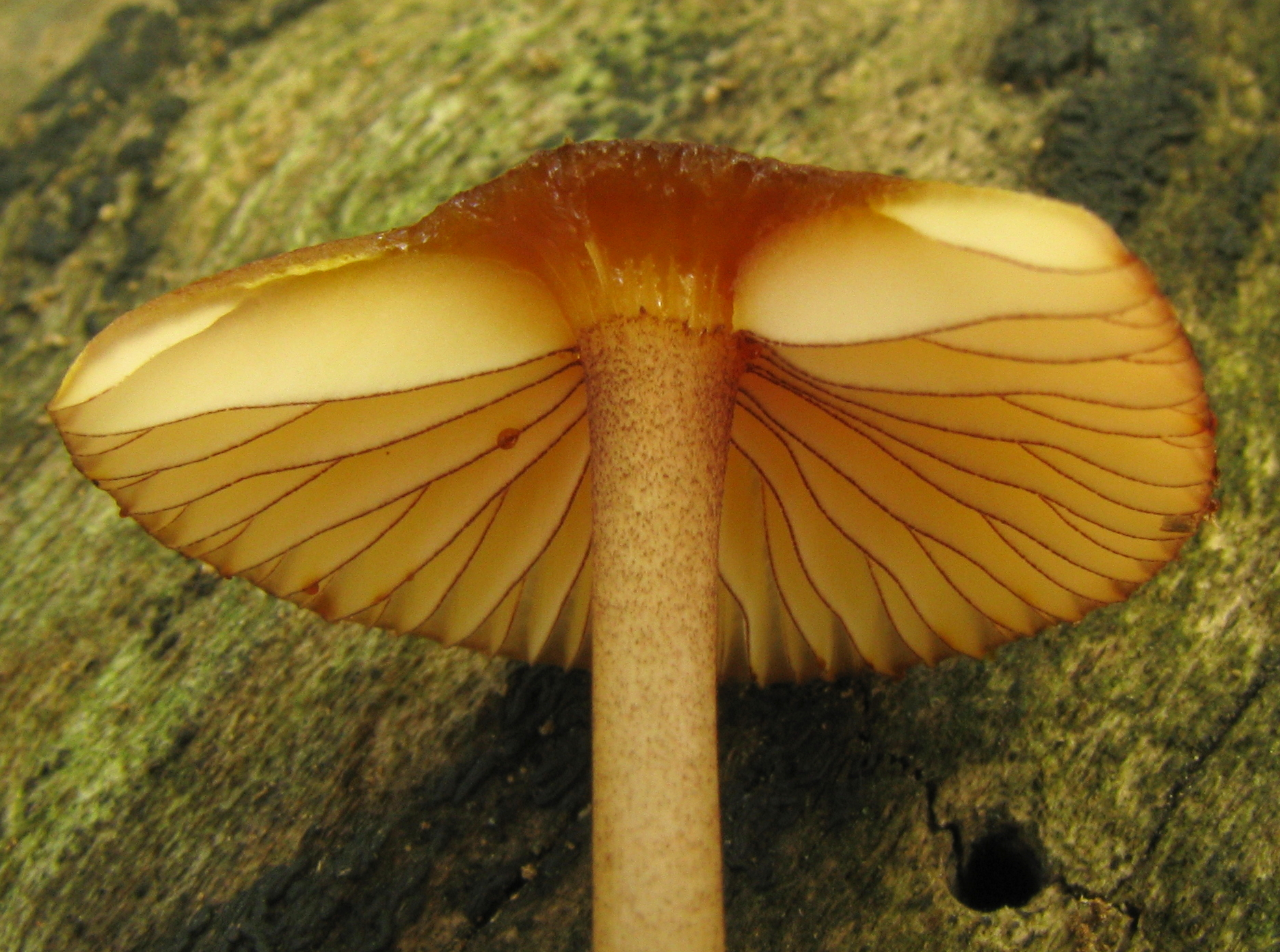
This broken cap shows the maroon edges of the gills, and the reddish-brown juice 'bled' from damaged tissue.

The cap is 1–30 mm (0.04–1.18 in) broad, initially obtuse to convex, later becoming broadly umbonate. Eventually the cap flattens, sometimes with the disc (the central region of the cap) slightly depressed. The cap margin initially touches the stem; as it expands it becomes somewhat wavy. The extreme margin is marked by small lines, grooves or ridges when the cap is moist. The cap is initially covered with white powdery granules, but this later sloughs off to leave a smooth surface. The disc is brownish when young, but soon develops reddish tones; older specimens are bay to Isabella, with lighter-colored margins. The flesh is buff-colored, and oozes an orange-yellow juice when cut. The gills have an adnate attachment to the stem. They have a close to moderately crowded spacing, with between 23 and 26 gills reaching the stem. The gills are narrow to moderately broad, chamoisee when young, somewhat darker in age, with edges that are maroon, and either crenulate (finely scalloped) or even. The stem is 2–4 cm (0.8–1.6 in) long, 2–3 mm thick, and more or less equal in width throughout. The stem base is rooted among the leaves and debris, and the base is covered with short stiff hairs pressed flat against the surface. Its surface is covered sparsely with minute purplish brown fibrils. The stem is dull reddish brown overall, but the color fades near the top. When mushroom tissue is cut or injured, it oozes a dull reddish-brown juice or, in old specimens, a dull orange juice. M. atkinsoniana mushrooms have no distinctive taste or odor.

The spores are narrowly to broadly ellipsoid, amyloid (staining black to blue-black in Melzer's reagent), and measure 7–9 by 4–5 μm. The basidia (spore-bearing cells) are four-spored and measure 28–30 by 6–7 μm. Cheilocystidia are plentiful, and arranged so as to form a sterile band on the edge of the gill. Measuring, they are narrowly fusoid (tapered at each end), smooth, and have dark reddish contents. The pleurocystidia (cystidia on the gill face) similar in appearance to the cheilocystidia but far less abundant. Gill tissue is yellowish to very faintly vinaceous-brown when stained with iodine. The tissue of the cap consists of several layers. The outer surface comprises a thin cuticle made of narrow hyphae filled with dark-reddish material. Underlying this layer this is a region of vesiculose (swollen like a bladder) cells, while the remainder of the cap tissue consists of narrower woolly hyphae. Both layers of tissue beneath the cuticle will stain very faintly vinaceous-brown in iodine; the stem tissue, in contrast, stains dark vinaceous-brown in iodine.

=== Similar species ===
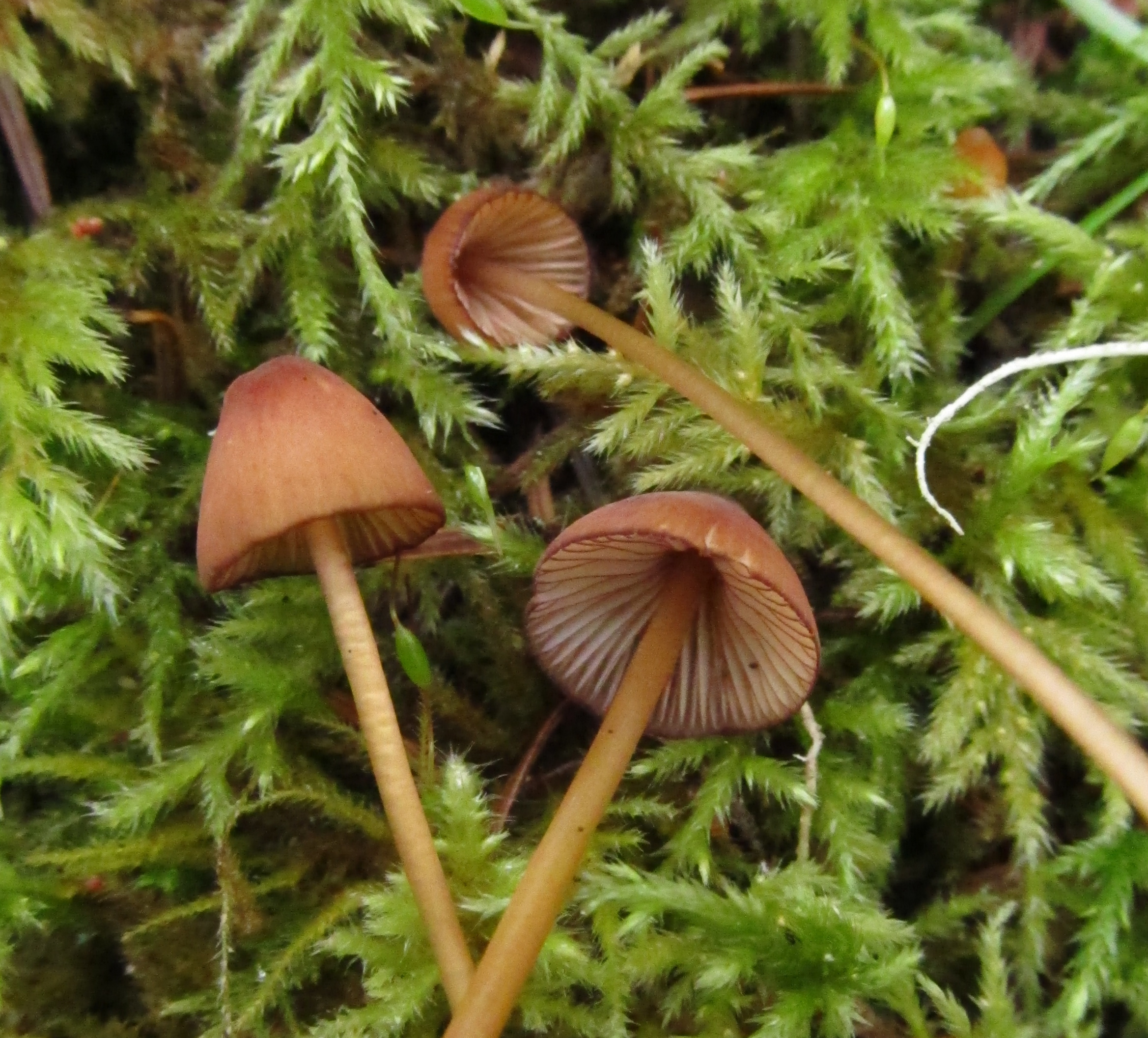
Mycena sanguinolenta

The "bleeding" will distinguish Mycena atkinsoniana from most other Mycena species commonly encountered. The common and widely distributed M. sanguinolenta is another "bleeder", but it is smaller than M. atkinsonia, with a cap diameter ranging from 3 to 15 mm (0.1 to 0.6 in). Additionally, it has distantly spaced gills and a stem that is the same color as the cap, and a dark red juice. M. atkinsoniana is also similar in stature to M. pelianthina (a non-bleeding species), but several field characteristics distinguish M. pelianthina, including a radish-like odor and taste, a purplish to lilac-colored cap, and purple-gray gills with dark purple edges.

== Habitat and distribution ==
The fungus is saprobic, and so derives nutrients from breaking down dead plant material, such as leaves, bark, needles, and twigs, that has fallen to the ground. Fruit bodies are usually found growing in groups or scattered on leaf litter in beech and beech-hemlock forests during the summer and autumn, although it has been recorded growing on lawns. It is also often found under eastern North American oaks. The distribution includes the US states Connecticut, New York, Ohio, Michigan, and Vermont. It has also been collected in Quebec, Canada.
