= George Francis Atkinson =

American botanist and mycologist

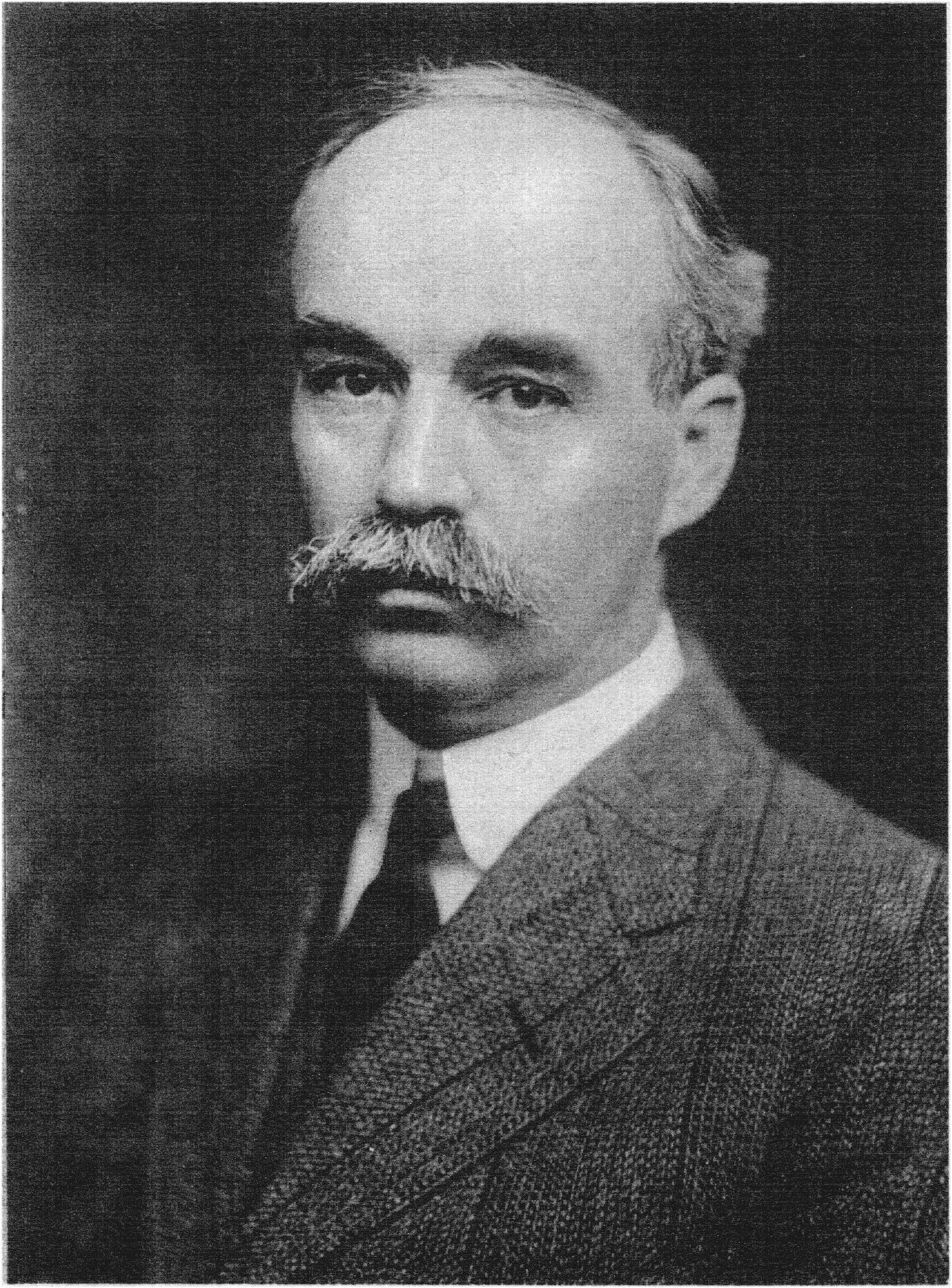
- Born: January 26, 1854; Raisinville, Michigan, U.S.
- Died: November 14, 1918 (aged 64); Tacoma, Washington, U.S.
- Education: Cornell University
- Occupations: Mycologist; botanist; entomologist; ornithologist; naturalist; photographer; writer

George Francis Atkinson (January 26, 1854 – November 14, 1918) was an American botanist and mycologist.

He was born on January 26, 1854, in Raisinville, Michigan, and died on November 14, 1918. He was the son of Joseph and Josephine Atkinson (née Fish). He studied at Olivet College from 1878 to 1883 and obtained his bachelor's degree from Cornell University in 1885. He is best known for his contributions to the fields of mycology and botany.

== Career ==
He was an assistant professor of entomology and zoology from 1885 to 1886, and associate professor in 1886 to 1888 at the University of North Carolina. He was a professor of botany and zoology at the University of South Carolina from 1888 to 1889 and a botanist at the Experiment Station of the University. From 1889 to 1892 he taught biology at the Agricultural and Mechanical College of Alabama; from 1892 to 1893 he was an assistant professor of cryptogamic botany at Cornell University, then associate professor (1893–1896), and from 1896, Chairman of the Botany Department. He was President of the Botanical Society of America in 1907, elected to the American Philosophical Society in 1913, and was elected to the National Academy of Sciences in the Spring of 1918. His herbarium of fungus specimens is at the Cornell Plant Pathology Herbarium (CUP).

He was the author of the book First Studies of Plant Life (1901) which was a text book for the nature study movement. A UK edition was published in 1905, which had been revised by Emily Margaret Wood with new plant examples, illustrations and photographs for the UK market.

Atkinson died from influenza and pneumonia on November 14, 1918.

== Eponymous taxa ==
- Atkinsonella Diehl
- Amanita atkinsoniana Coker
- Armillaria atkinsoniana (Coker) Locq.
- Boletus atkinsonianus
- Calonectria atkinsonii
- Cercospora atkinsonii
- Ceriomyces atkinsonianus
- Conocybe atkinsonii
- Corticium atkinsonii
- Cortinarius atkinsonianus
- Galerina atkinsoniana
- Ganoderma atkinsonii
- Kirschsteiniothelia atkinsonii
- Kneiffia atkinsonii
- Lachnocladium atkinsonii
- Mycena atkinsoniana
- Mycena atkinsonii
- Peniophora atkinsonii
- Phlebia atkinsoniana
- Puccinia atkinsoniana
- Pulveroboletus atkinsonianus
- Ramaria atkinsonii
- Scoleconectria atkinsonii

== See also ==
- List of mycologists
