= Appenzell goat =

Swiss breed of goat

Appenzell
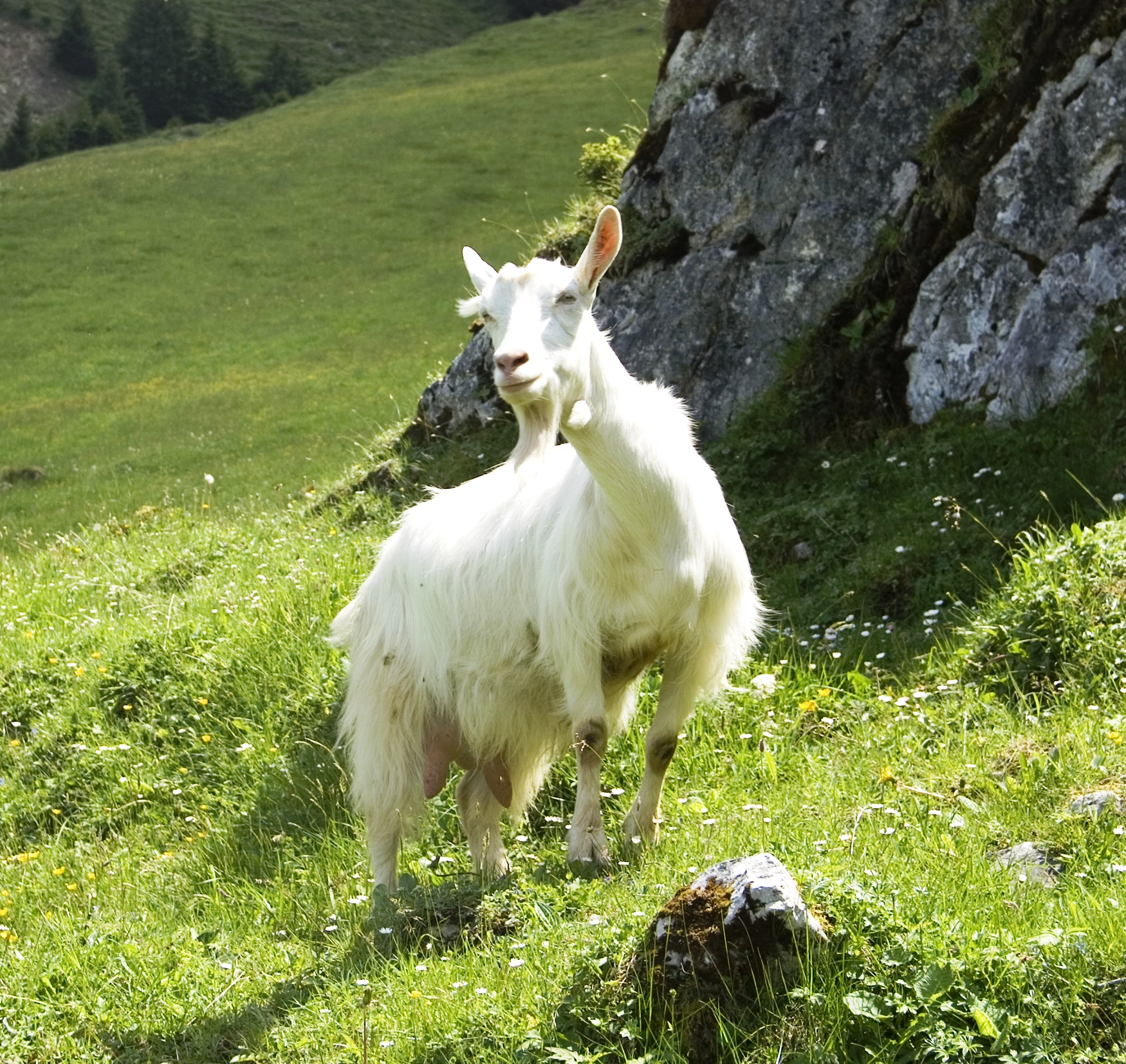
- Conservation status: FAO (2007): endangered-maintained
- Other names: French: Chèvre d’Appenzell; German: Appenzellerziege
- Country of origin: Switzerland
- Distribution: Appenzell Ausserrhoden; Appenzell Innerrhoden; Canton of St. Gallen
- Use: milk; vegetation management

Traits
- Weight: Male: 65 kg; Female: 45 kg
- Height: Male: 80 cm; Female: 75 cm
- Coat: white
- Face colour: white
- Horn status: usually polled
- Goat; Capra aegagrus hircus

The Appenzell, French: Chèvre d’Appenzell, German: Appenzellerziege, is a rare and endangered indigenous breed of white domestic goat from Switzerland. It originates in the "half-cantons" of the historic Appenzell region, Appenzell Ausserrhoden and Appenzell Innerrhoden, and has spread into the neighbouring Canton of St. Gallen.

== History ==
The Appenzeller originates in the "half-cantons" of the historic Appenzell region, Appenzell Ausserrhoden and Appenzell Innerrhoden. A goat-breeders' association, the Ziegenzuchtgenossenschaft Appenzell, was founded in Innerrhoden in February 1902, and another, the Ziegenzuchtgenossenschaft Urnäsch, in Ausserrhoden in 1914.

The Schweizerischer Ziegenzuchtverband, the Swiss federation of cantonal goat breeders' associations, runs a conservation and recovery project for the Appenzeller which includes financial support for breeders and a controlled breeding programme. In 2007 the conservation status of the breed was listed by the FAO as "endangered-maintained".

In 2005, the Appenzell breed represented approximately 4.2% of the total registered Swiss goat population of about 70000 head. At the end of 2013 a population of 1900–2000 was reported to DAD-IS; in 2021 the population was reported to be between 1233 and 4167, with 77 breeding males.

In the 1920s, the Appenzeller was cross-bred with the Saanen to create the composite Zürcher Ziege in the area of Zurich and Thurgau. A herd-book was started in 1926; in 1938, the remaining stock was merged into the Appenzeller. The Appenzeller also contributed to the development of the Toggenburg.

== Characteristics ==
The Appenzeller is completely white, with a medium-long to long hair coat. It is usually polled; horned animals are accepted. The milk yield averages just over 800 kg per year.
