= Oberhasli goat =

Breed of goat

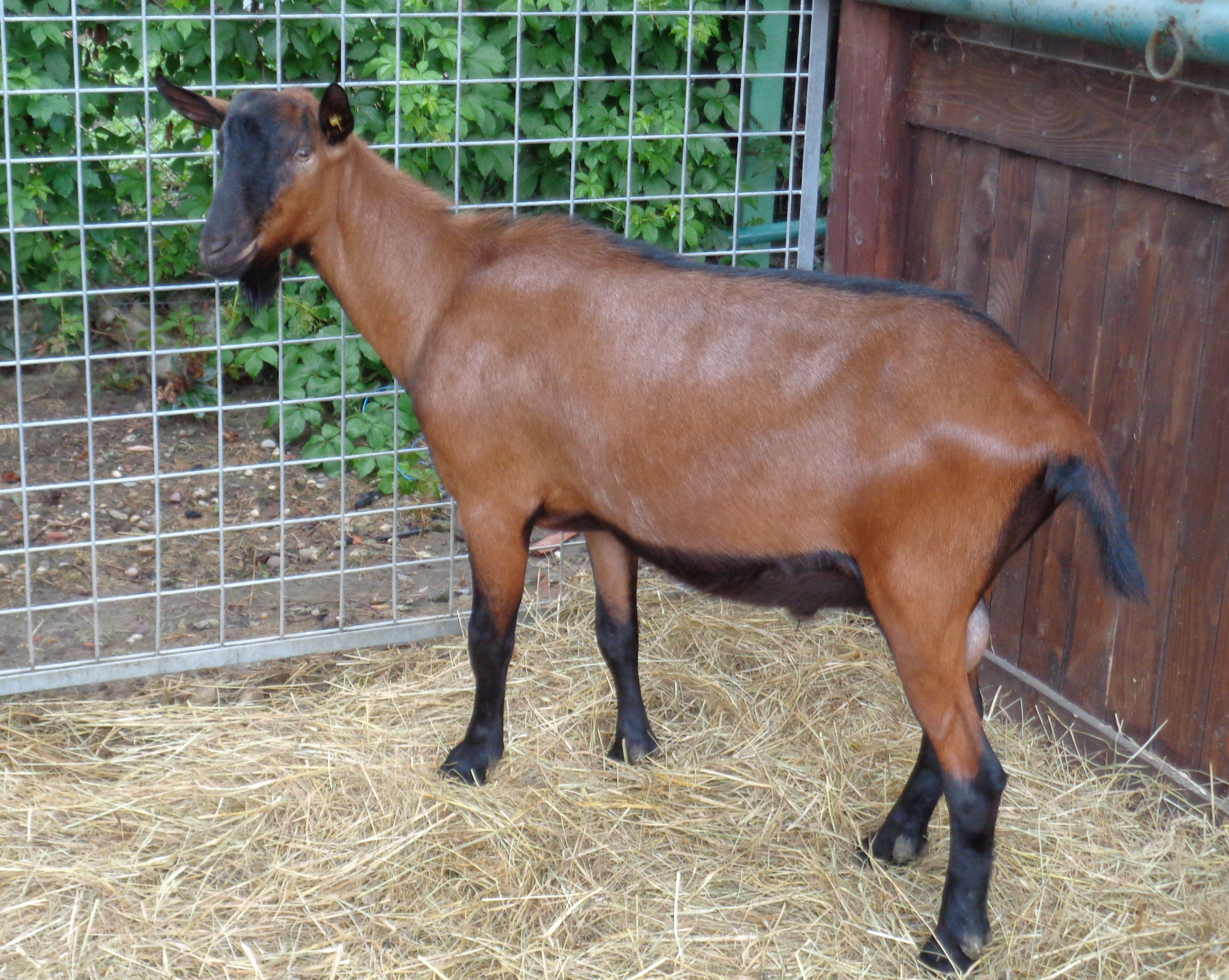
- Other names: Swiss Alpine
- Country of origin: Originated in the Swiss Alps. Brought over to United States in 1900s.
- Standard: ADGA/AGS
- Use: milk

Traits
- Weight: Male: 68 kg (150 lb); Female: 54 kg (120 lb)
- Height: Male: 76 cm (30 in); Female: 71 cm (28 in)
- Hair color: chamoisée; brown with black dorsal stripe and lower legs
- Horn status: horned or polled

Notes
- Website: Oberhasli Breeders of America
- Goat; Capra aegagrus hircus

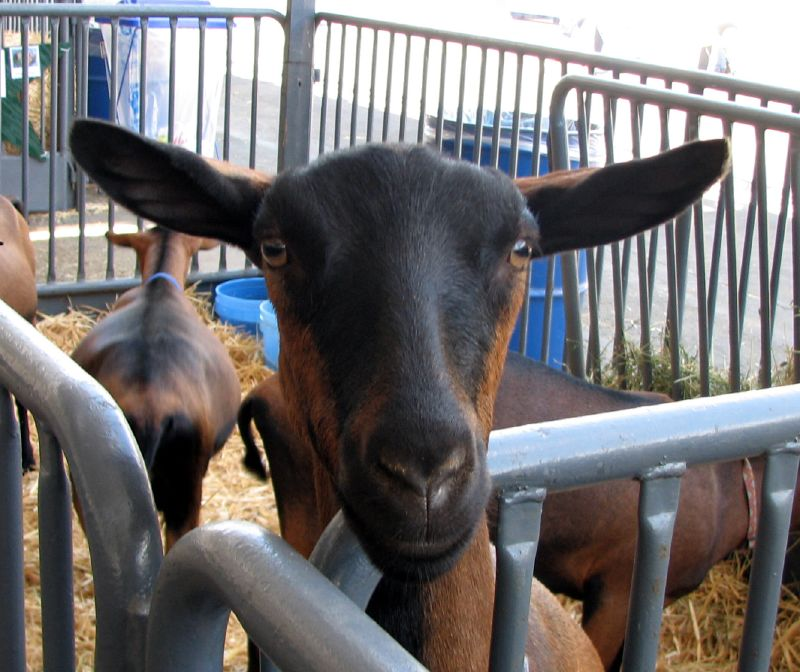
Oberhasli with atypical facial coloration; the two eyestripes are not apparent

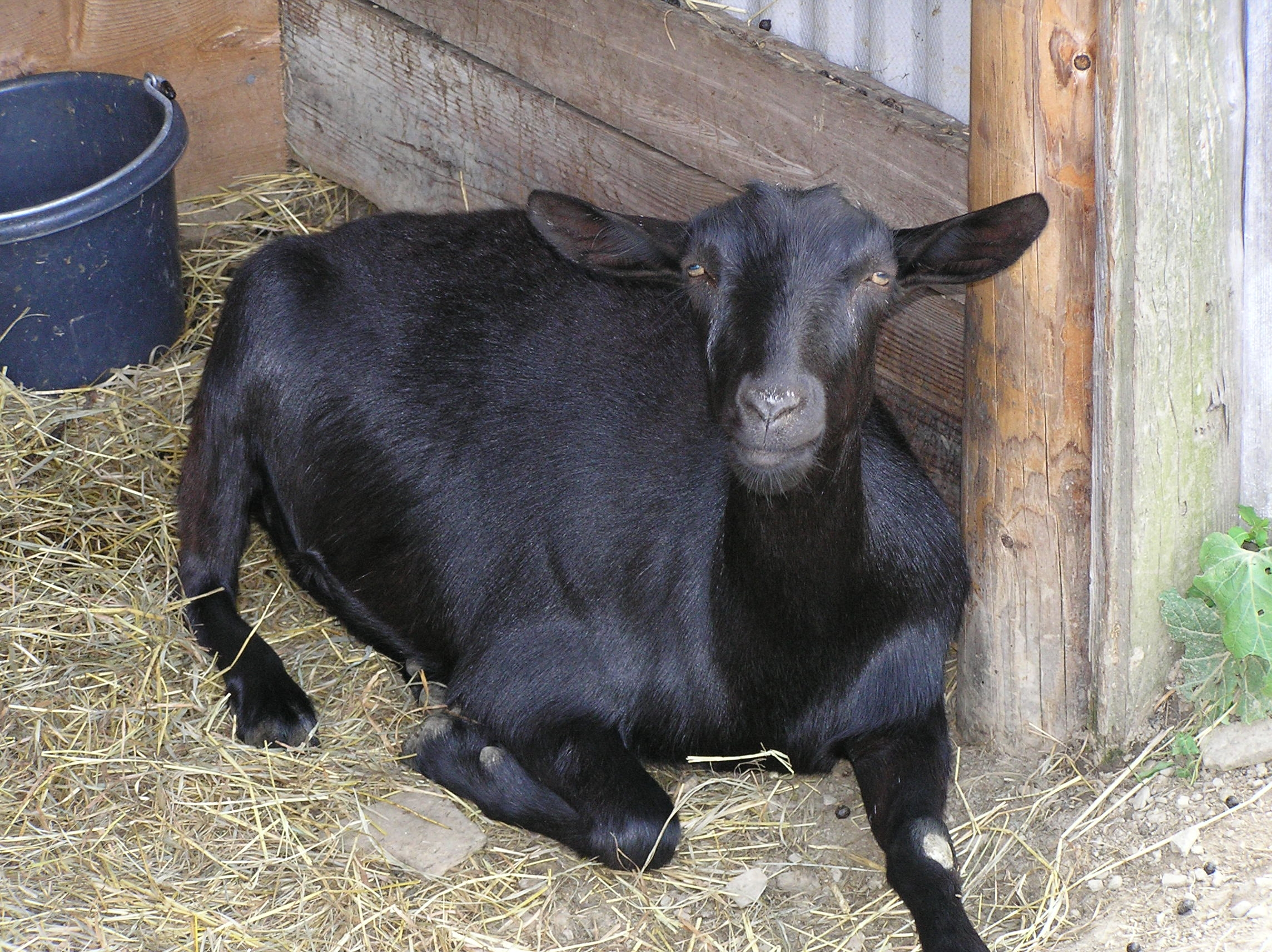
A black Oberhasli; only does may be black

The Oberhasli is a modern American breed of dairy goat. It derives from the subtype of Chamois Colored Goat from the Oberhasli district of the Bernese Oberland in central Switzerland. All purebred members of the breed descend from five Chamois Colored Goats imported to the United States in 1936. A breeder's association was formed in 1977, and a herdbook established in the following year. Until then, goats of this type had been known as Swiss Alpine, and interbred with Alpine goats of other types.

== History ==
Goats of Oberhasli type were imported to the USA in 1906 and in 1920, but these goats were not bred pure and the bloodlines were lost. In 1936, H. O. Pence imported five Chamois Colored Goats from Switzerland to the United States; all purebred Oberhasli in the USA descend from these. Until the 1970s these animals were registered as Swiss Alpines. Crossbreeds with French Alpine or American Alpine stock were registered as American Alpines.

An association of breeders, the Oberhasli Breeders of America, was formed in about 1977. In 1978 or 1979 the Oberhasli was accepted as a breed by the American Dairy Goat Association (ADGA). A purebred herd maintained with records by Esther Oman, a breeder in California, was the foundation of the new breed. In 1980 the ADGA retrieved part-bred Oberhasli-type goats from its other herdbooks.

In 2010 a total of 1729 head, distributed over approximately 30 states, was reported to DAD-IS, based on data from one (unspecified) breed registry only.

== Characteristics ==
Standards for the Oberhasli are published by the American Dairy Goat Association and by the American Goat Society.

The coloring of the breed is called "chamoisée" or "chamoisee" for its perceived resemblance to the colors of the wild Alpine chamois. The coat is bay or mid-brown, with black markings consisting of two black facial stripes through the eyes to the muzzle, a black forehead, a black dorsal stripe or mule stripe, and black belly and lower limbs. Does, but not bucks, may also be solid black.

The Oberhasli milk production record per lactation is 2,116 kg (4,665 lb).
