= Della Robbia Pottery =

British maker of art pottery around 1900

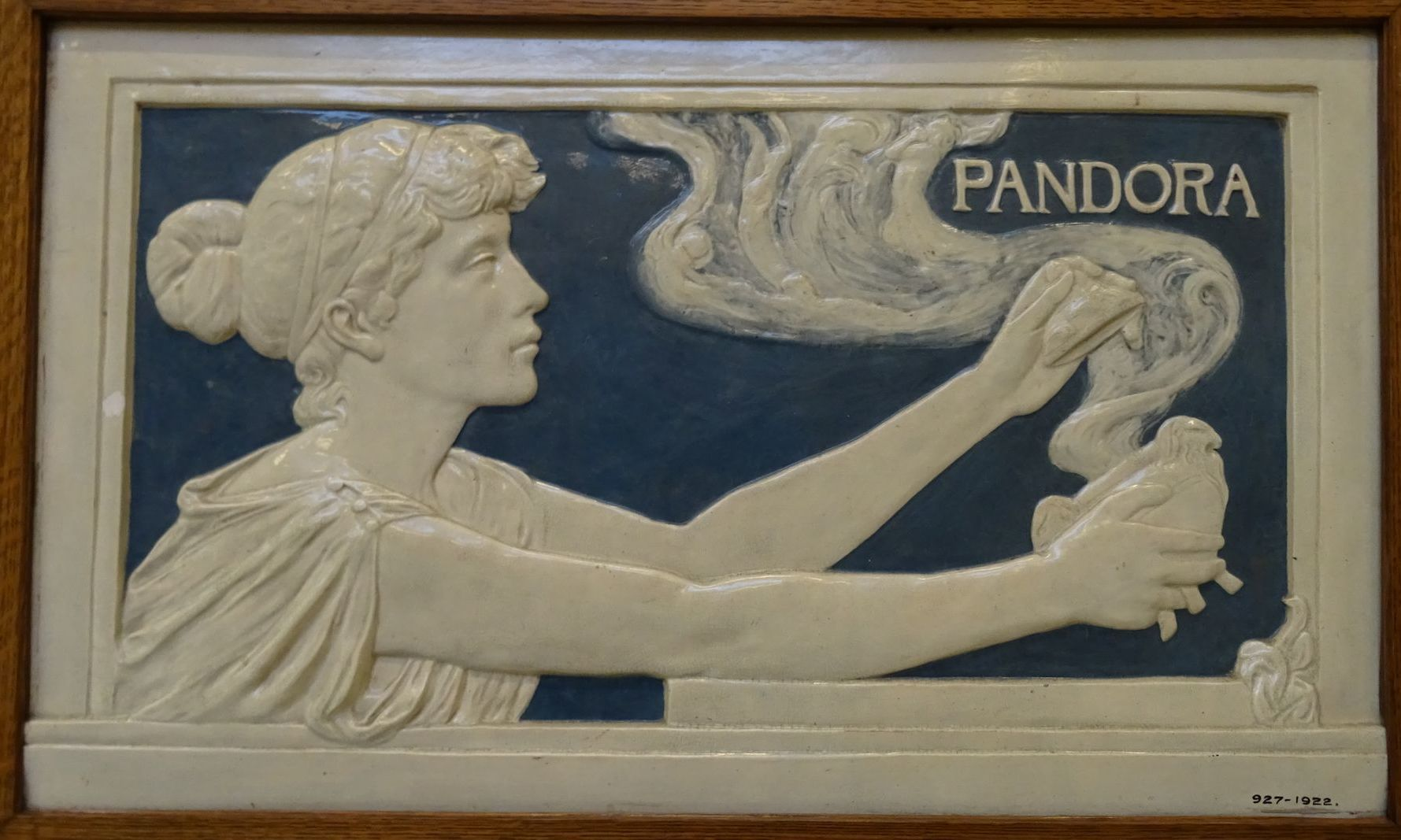
Plaque of Pandora

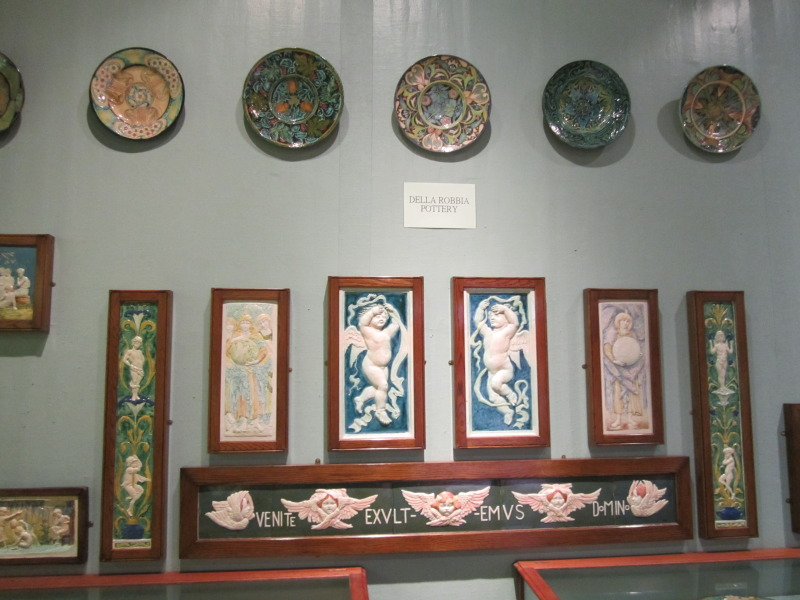
Display at the Williamson Art Gallery and Museum, Birkenhead

The Della Robbia Pottery was a ceramic factory founded in 1894 in Birkenhead, near Liverpool, England. It closed in 1906. Initially it mostly made large pieces with high artistic aspirations, especially relief panels for architectural use, but also ornamental vessels and plates, intended for display rather than use.

The name was taken from the famous family workshop founded by Luca della Robbia in 15th-century Florence, which specialized in large coloured reliefs installed on walls. Some of the Birkenhead pieces imitated this style closely, while others drew from the more general style of Italian maiolica.

The pottery was established as a true Arts & Crafts pottery on the lines advocated by William Morris, using local labour and raw materials such as local red clay from Moreton, Wirral. The pottery, all earthenware, had lustrous lead glazes and often used patterns of interweaving plants, typical of Art Nouveau, with heraldic and Islamic motifs.

It wares are not to be confused with earlier wares marked "Della Robbia" produced by Charles Canning in Tamworth. These were often smaller items in more conventional Victorian taste, with painting, often floral, sometimes in overglaze enamel, rather than the coloured glazes used in Birkenhead.

In the early 20th century, Roseville pottery, an American pottery company used "Della Robbia" as a brand for wares (now very expensive) designed by Frederick Hurten Rhead, who emigrated from England in 1902.

== Founders ==
The business was started by Harold Steward Rathbone and Conrad Gustave d'Huc Dressler (1856-1940). Rathbone, son of a wealthy local business man, Philip Rathbone, had been a pupil of Ford Madox Brown, who was one of the founders of the Arts and Crafts movement.

Dressler was a sculptor, potter and also inventor of the continuous firing tunnel kiln. Giovanni Carlo Valentino Manzoni joined the pottery in early 1894, leaving to establish his own pottery, the Minerva Art Ware Manufacturers in Hanley in July 1895. Manzoni returned to the pottery in June 1898, staying until its closure in 1906.

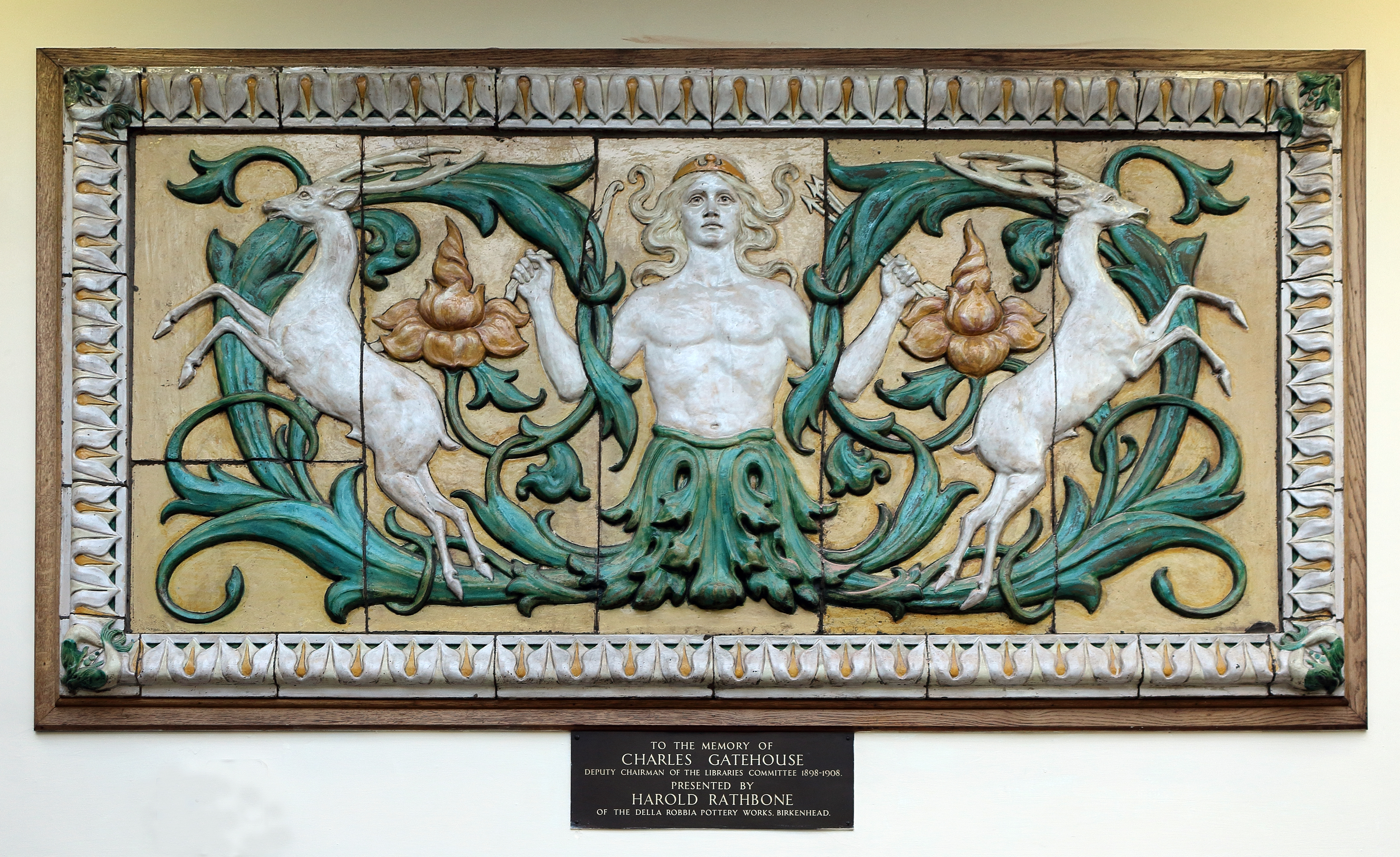
Green Man relief, Birkenhead Central Library

== Products ==
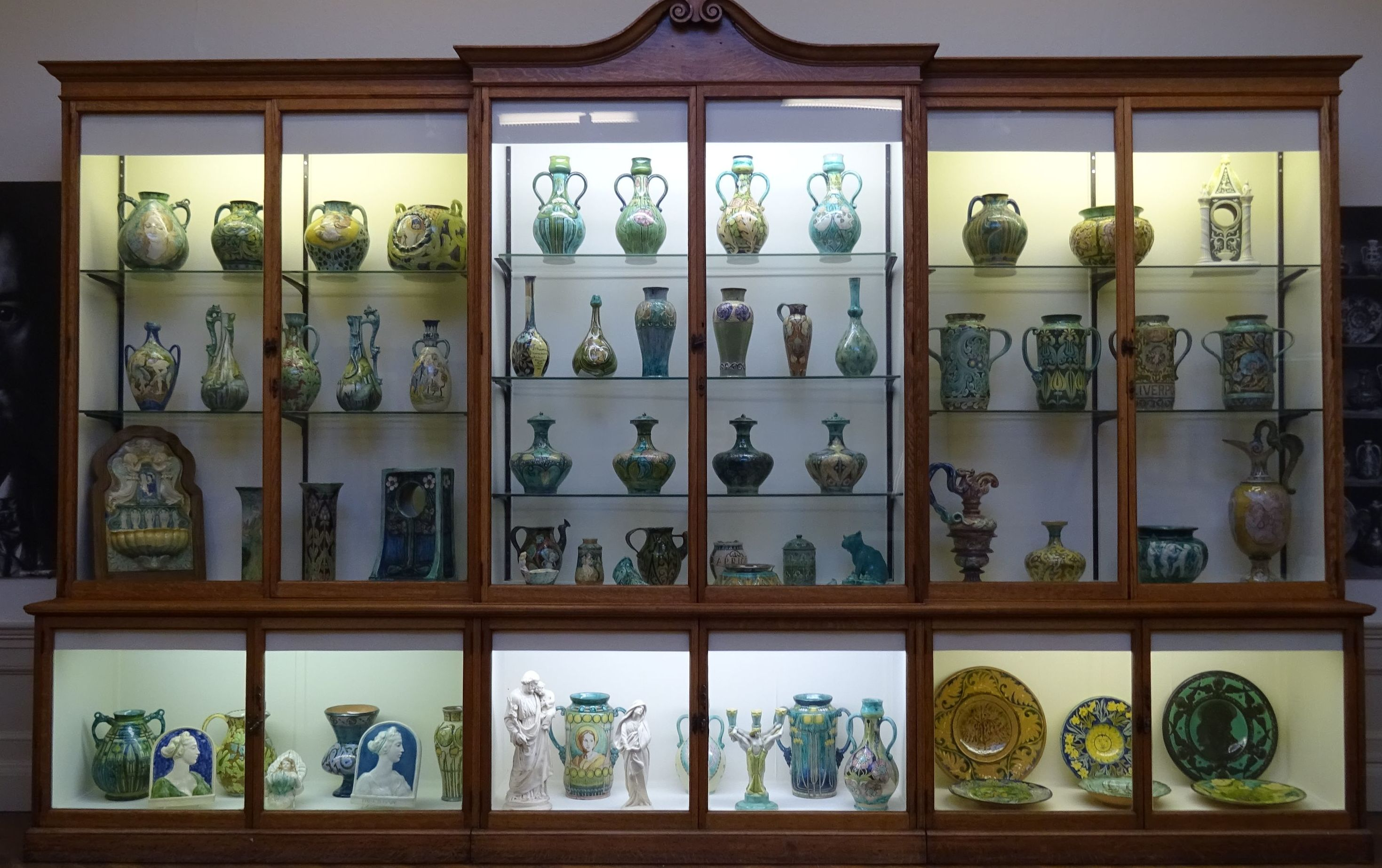
Display case, Williamson Art Gallery

Dressler was mainly responsible for the decorative architectural panels, many of which can still be seen in the local area of Birkenhead and Liverpool, as well as in the local museums. The brightly coloured panels, inspired by the work of the Florentine sculptor Luca della Robbia and his family, did not prove to be very popular on the dark brick buildings of the period, the pottery turning to large two-handled vases, presentation wares, wall chargers and plates, as well as ceramic clock cases, tiled window boxes, numerous types of vases and similar wares, as a source of income. Dressler left the pottery in 1897 to establish his own pottery, the Medmenham Pottery, in Marlow, Buckinghamshire.

The Della Robbia mark is usually handwritten on the base of pieces with a ship device, and often the initials of the designer and decorator, and sometimes the date. Example initials include:

- C for Charles Collis
- C.A.W. for Cassandia Annie Walker
- C.M. for Carlo Manzoni
- E.W. and E.M.W. for Emily Margaret Wood
- L.W. for Liza Wilkins
- R.B for Ruth Bare
- P.J for Percy Jacques

== Later period ==
The cost of making the Della Robbia products was greater than the prices that could be charged. Even with the introduction of the professional services of a thrower and kiln man, as well as the use of commercial glazes and raw materials, the pottery could not make a commercial success of itself. In 1900 Marianne de Caluwé joined the pottery, injecting finance as well as bringing a new direction with her strong Art Nouveau influence. New exhibition venues in Scotland, even a renewed interest in the pottery's wares from 1900 through to 1904 could not help it survive, and so the pottery closed in 1906.

Della Robbia art pottery was widely sold by Liberty & Co. as well as in their own retail outlet in Liverpool. A large collection of Della Robbia pottery can be seen at the Williamson Art Gallery in Birkenhead. Some is also at Standen (near East Grinstead) owned by the National Trust, and the Walker Art Gallery in Liverpool.

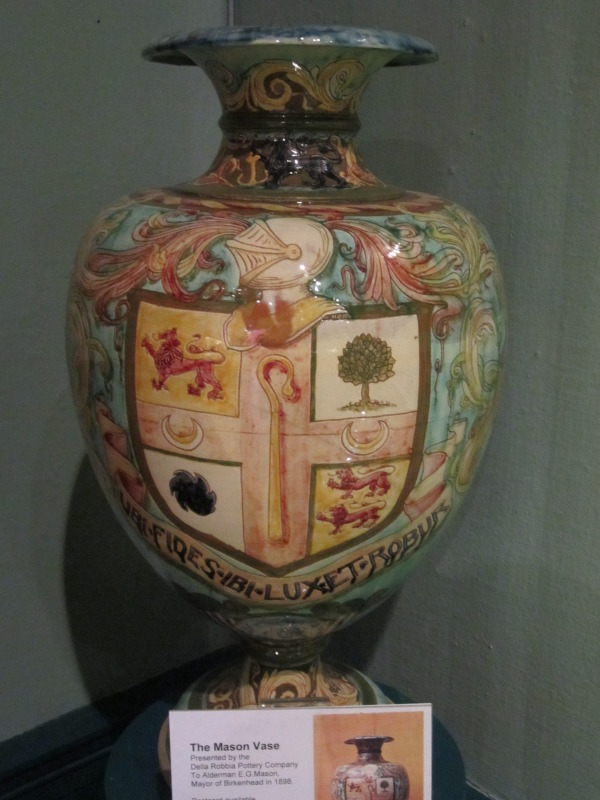
Presentation vase, 1898

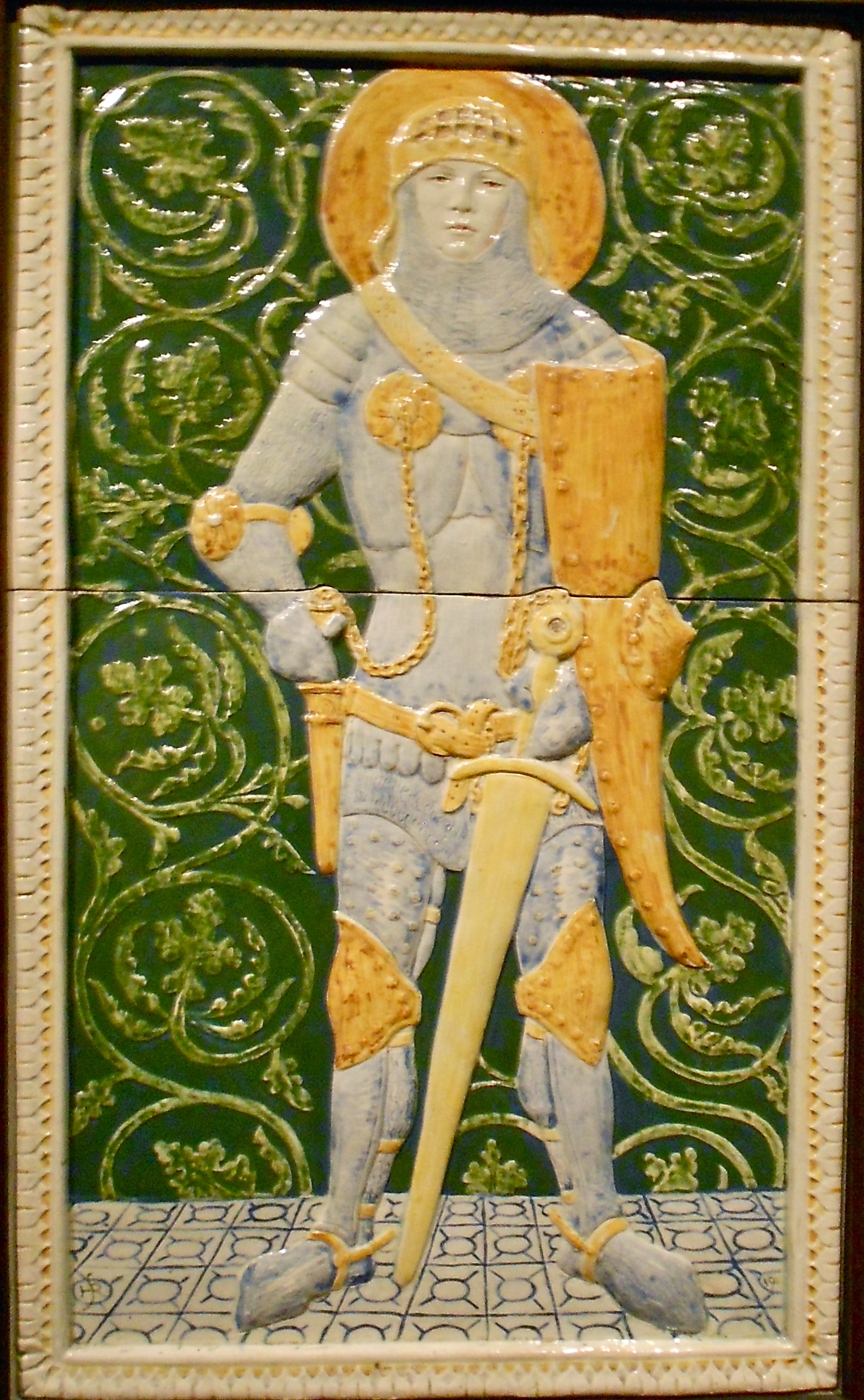
Gideon, 1900, designed by Harold Steward Rathbone

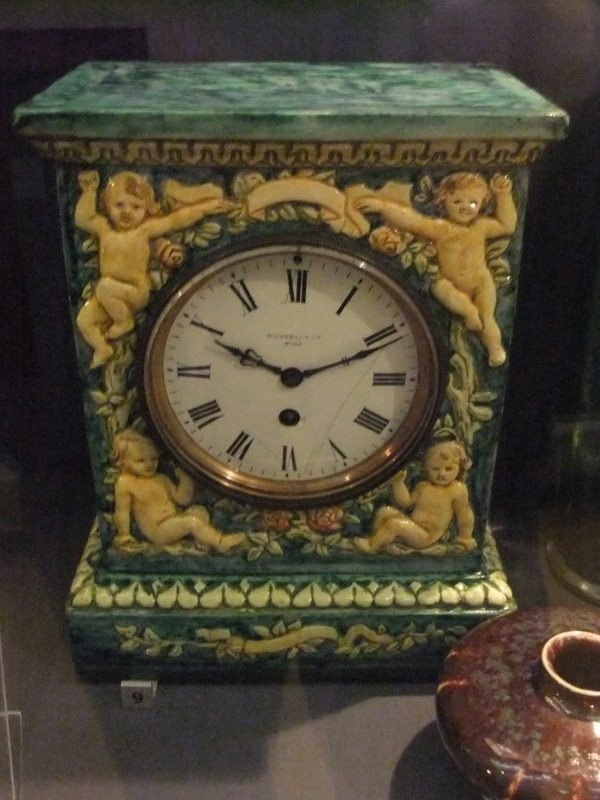
Clock case, 1903

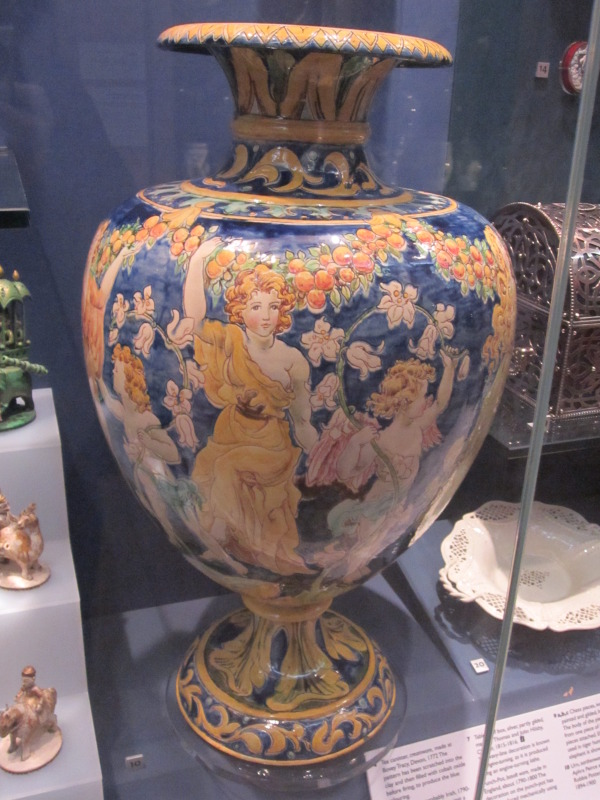
Vase, Walker Art Gallery

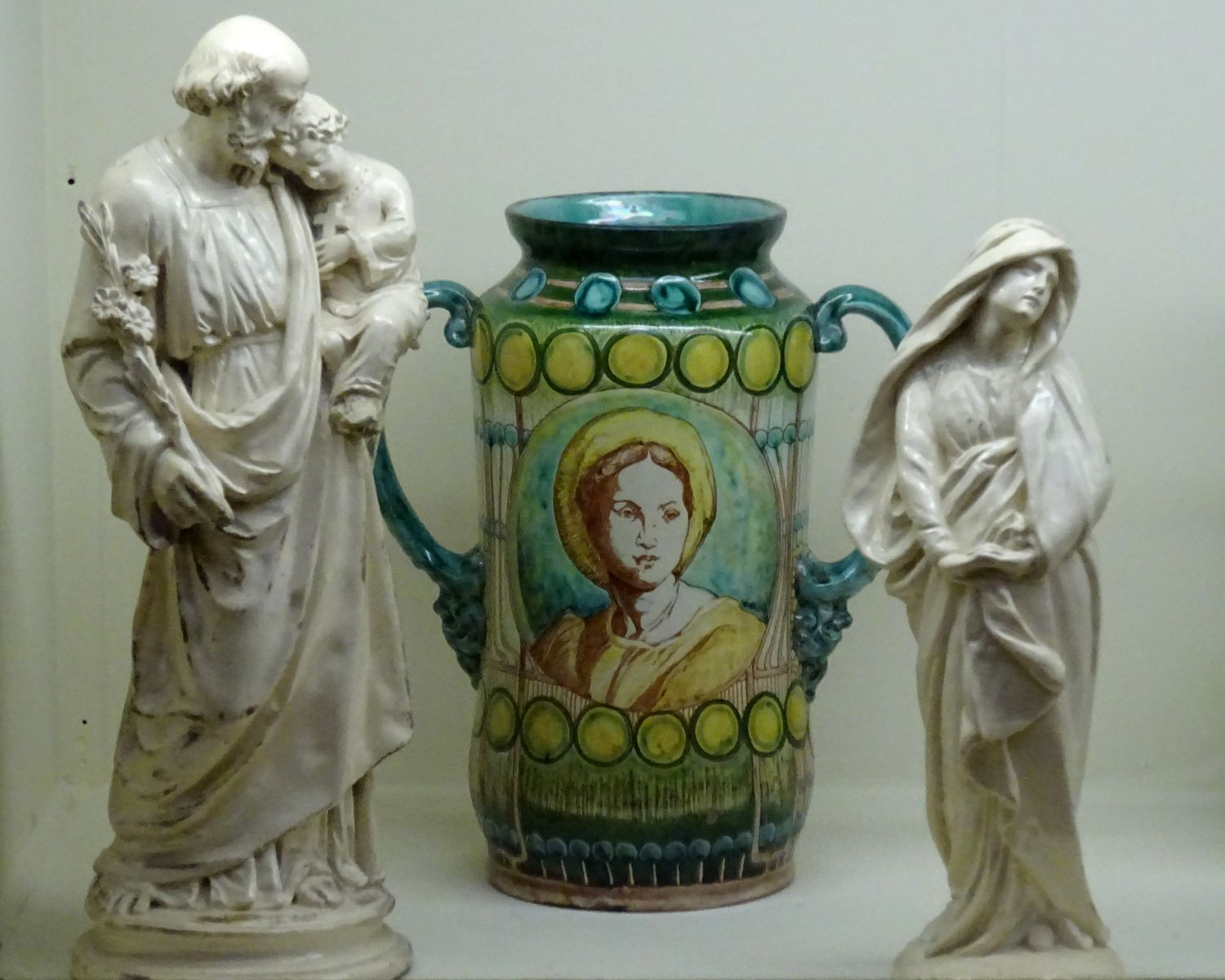
Williamson Art Gallery display

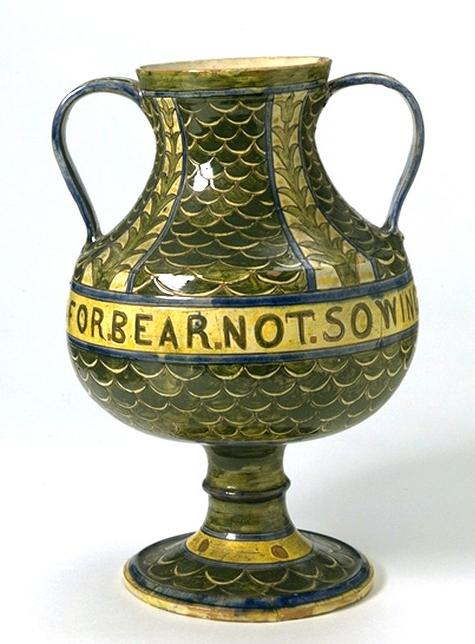
Vase, 1894-1906, V&A Museum

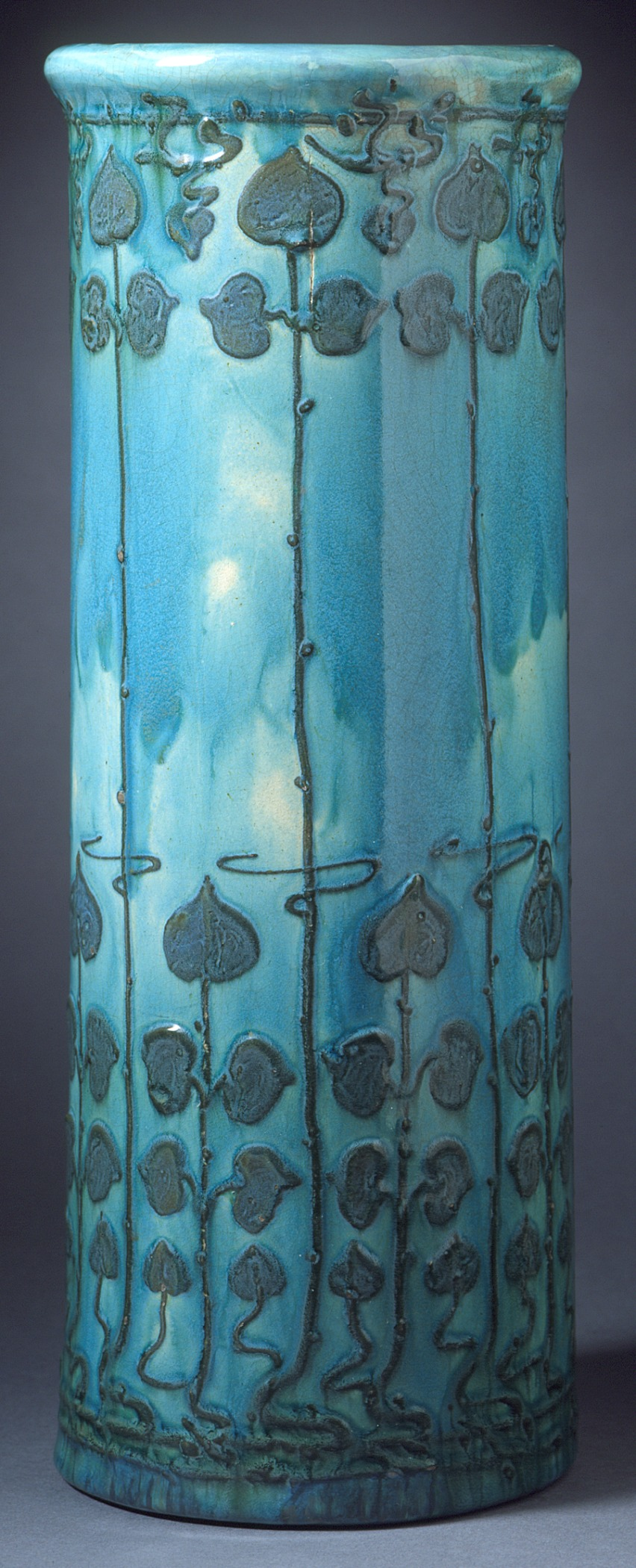
Vase, 1903

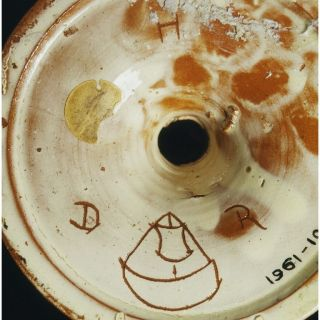
Della Robbia ship mark

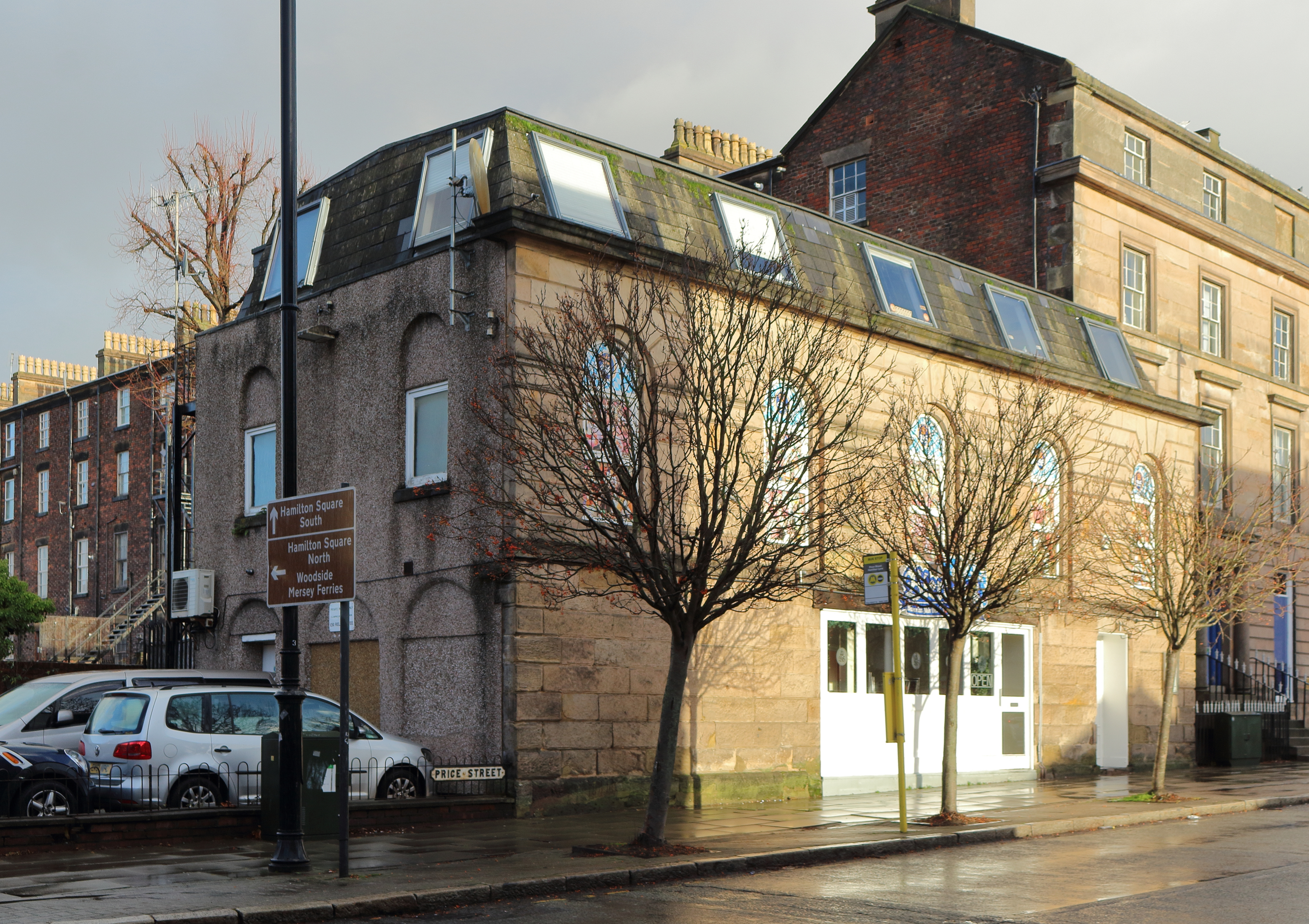
The former works at 2A Price Street, Birkenhead
