= British Alpine =

British breed of goat

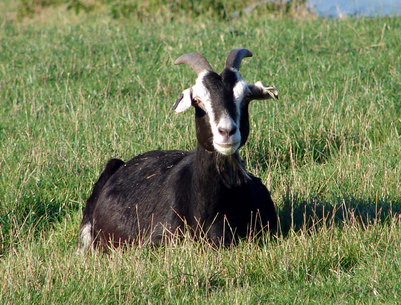
- Conservation status: World-wide: FAO (2007): no data; DAD-IS (2024): not at risk; United Kingdom: DAD-IS (2024): at risk/endangered; RBST (2024): not listed
- Country of origin: United Kingdom
- Distribution: Africa; Australia; Caribbean; South America
- Standard: British Alpine Breed Society
- Type: dairy
- Use: milk

Traits
- Weight: average 64 kg; Male: 77 kg; Female: 59 kg
- Height: Male: 91–97 cm; Female: 76–81 cm
- Coat: black with white Swiss markings
- Horn status: horned or polled
- Goat; Capra aegagrus hircus

The British Alpine is a British breed of dairy goat bred in the early twentieth century. It is black with white Swiss markings on the face.

The foundation stock included a nanny with this colouration acquired in Paris in 1903 and goats of other breeds, probably including the Swiss Grisons Striped and Toggenburg and the now-extinct Sundgau of Alsace, as well as some native British goats.

There are large numbers in Australia, and its conservation status world-wide is not at risk; in the United Kingdom it is an endangered breed, with fewer than five hundred head.

== History ==
The British Alpine was bred in the early twentieth century, principally from goats originating in continental Europe, particularly from Switzerland. The foundation animal was a nanny named Sedgemere Faith, black with white Swiss markings, acquired from the Jardin Zoologique d'Acclimatation of Paris in 1903. Breeds including the Bündner Strahlenziege ('Grisons Striped') and Toggenburger of Switzerland and the now-extinct Sundgau of Alsace are thought to have contributed to the development of the breed, as did some native British goats. It was officially recognised for showing in 1921, and in 1925 a section was opened for it in the herd-book of the British Goat Society. A breed society, the British Alpine Breed Society, was formed in 1979.

It was introduced into Australia in 1958, and has been exported to several other countries, among them Botswana, Lesotho and South Africa in Africa, Barbados and Trinidad and Tobago in the Caribbean and Argentina and Brazil in South America. A population of 464 was reported in 2023 for the United Kingdom. The only country reporting a population in the thousands is Australia, where in 2022 the total number was estimated at 10000–20000; it is also the only country where the conservation status of the breed is "not at risk".

== Characteristics ==
The British Alpine is a large long-legged goat, with an average weight of about 64 kg. It may either have horns or be naturally polled. The profile of the face may be concave or straight.

The coat is fine and short; it is black with white Swiss markings on the face, with white markings also on the rump, the margins of the ears and the lower legs.

== Use ==
Average daily milk yield in the United Kingdom was calculated from measurements in about 2004 at 4.09 kg with 3.77% fat and 2.74% protein.

== See also ==
- Alpine (American goat breed)
