= Emily Margaret Wood =

English botanist and ceramic painter (1865 – 1907)

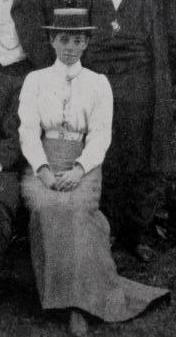
- Emily Margaret Wood pictured with the Liverpool Naturalists' Field Club in 1901.
- Born: 23 August 1865; Calcutta
- Died: 28 October 1907 (aged 42); Birkenhead
- Other names: E. Margaret Wood; E. M. Wood; EMW; Miss Wood
- Known for: botanist, botanical artist, ceramics painter for Della Robbia Pottery
- Notable work: illustrations of The Flora of the Liverpool District, 1902

Emily Margaret Wood (1865 – 1907) was an English botany teacher and painter of scientific illustrations and Arts and Crafts ceramics.

== Life ==
Wood was born 23 August 1865 in Calcutta, India, to Emily Maria (née Riddell) and Charles Bell Wood. She also had three brothers. Her mother was described as an artist and teacher of drawing, while her father's occupation was as a merchant and broker in India from a military family. She moved to England in 1871, probably sent away to school in Bromley while her parents remained in India. By the time she was 16, the whole family was living in Bromley. Wood studied art at the Bromley School of Science and Art in the mid 1880s, gaining certificates for drawing. The family moved to Wallasey near Liverpool around 1885 and after the death of her father in 1895 she and her mother moved into a smaller house in Birkenhead.

In 1903 she was working as a botany teacher at the Liscard School of Science and Art.

Wood died 28 October 1907 after being unwell for some time. The Liverpool Naturalists’ Field Club organised installing a monument on her grave.

=== Botany ===
Wood joined the Liverpool Naturalists’ Field Club in 1887. This organisation included a significant number of women members. She was sole botanical referee from 1900 and the joint secretary of the Liverpool Naturalists' Field Club from 1901 until her death. This role mean that she took on the major task or writing the society's reports and transactions. She was made an honorary member in 1904.

Her botanical contributions included collecting and publishing on plants of Denbighshire, illustrating C. Theodore Green’s (1902) Flora of the Liverpool District (including ferns as well as flowering plants), and making over 800 plant drawings.

Wood's contributions to the 1902 Flora of the Liverpool District are considered her major achievement. She produced all the line drawings, which are life-like and show major identification characters. In addition she coloured in a copy of this book that was donated to the local Birkenhead library. She also provided many of the plant records, especially of more uncommon species.

She also led botanical expeditions for the field club and gave free lectures at Liverpool's Free Public Library. She is known to have collected specimens for her personal herbarium but this does not appear to have survived, apart from 2 specimens now in the National Museum of Wales. In addition, she wrote for the Liverpool Mercury (later Liverpool Daily Post) newspaper in long 'country diary' style columns from 1903, and monthly essays for the Wallasey Chronicle during 1906-7.

Her paintings of flowers were exhibited at a meeting of the Associated Scientific Societies of Liverpool, in St. George’s Hall in 1887 and in 1892 in the Walker Art Gallery in Liverpool. In 1902 a collection of her watercolours of fungi, painted over previous decades were bought by Birkenhead Reference Library on the Wirral. These are now in the Williamson Art Gallery and Museum in Birkenhead. She entered a collection of plant specimens from around Llansannan into a competition in the National Eisteddfod of Wales in Rhyl in 1904 and won the first prize.

=== Teaching ===
Wood taught botany and nature study at Wallasey Technical School and other local institutions. In 1905, her UK version of the nature study textbook by the American George Francis Atkinson, (First Studies of Plant Life by George Francis Atkinson and E. M. Wood) was published. This book had been written to support the (then) new nature study movement. Wood replaced some examples and drawings of American plants with her own of typical UK species, and edited the text for UK usage.

=== Ceramics ===
From the late 1890s she was commissioned as a ceramics painter by Sir William Forwood for the Della Robbia Pottery, part of the Arts and Crafts movement's reaction against mass-production. She painted Art Nouveau-influenced vases and tiles with botanical and classical scenes, including executing a design by Ford Madox Brown, some of which are now in national museum collections. She also worked as a book-keeper for the project.
