= Conrad Dressler =

English sculptor and potter (1856–1940)

Conrad Gustave d'Huc Dressler (22 May 1856 – 3 August 1940) was an English sculptor and potter.

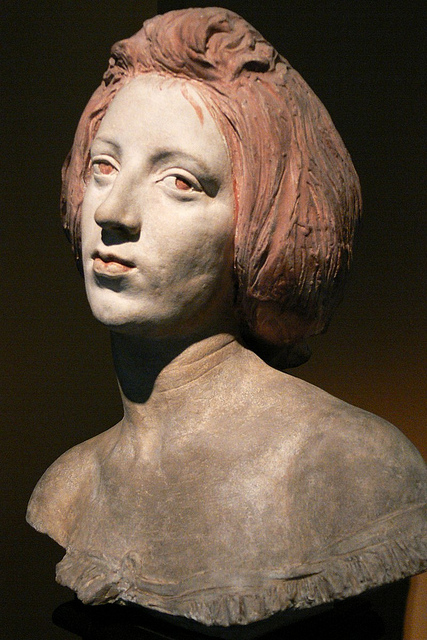
Portrait of Nita Maria Schonfeld Resch (1898)

== Biography ==
Dressler was born in Streatham to a German father and a French mother, both naturalised British citizens. He had three sisters; his sister Ada was a painter and sculptor. His father died when he was seven. Dressler studied sculpture at the Royal College of Art. He was later influenced by the Arts & Crafts Movement. In the 1880s, he worked at Cedar Studios in Chelsea, London. He worked in partnership with Harold Rathbone between 1894 and 1897 at the Della Robbia Pottery, and then moved to Marlow Common in Buckinghamshire, where he established the Medmenham Pottery specializing in architectural tiles and large wall panels, created from small sections. The business was financed by Robert William Hudson until 1906 when it changed into the Dressler Tunnel Ovens Ltd, the Medmenham tile designs continued to be made by J. H. Barratt of Stoke-on-Trent. Dressler designed an industrial level tunnel kiln for the English pottery industry, for which he was awarded the John Scott Medal of the Franklin Institute.

Later, Dressler lived in Paris and the United States. He died at Saint-Brévin l'Océan, Loire, France.
