= Saanen goat =

Swiss breed of goat

Saanen
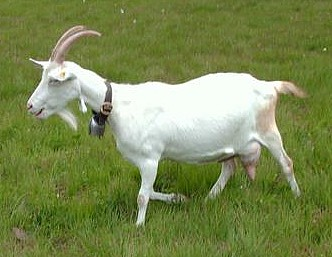
- Nanny on the Engstligenalp

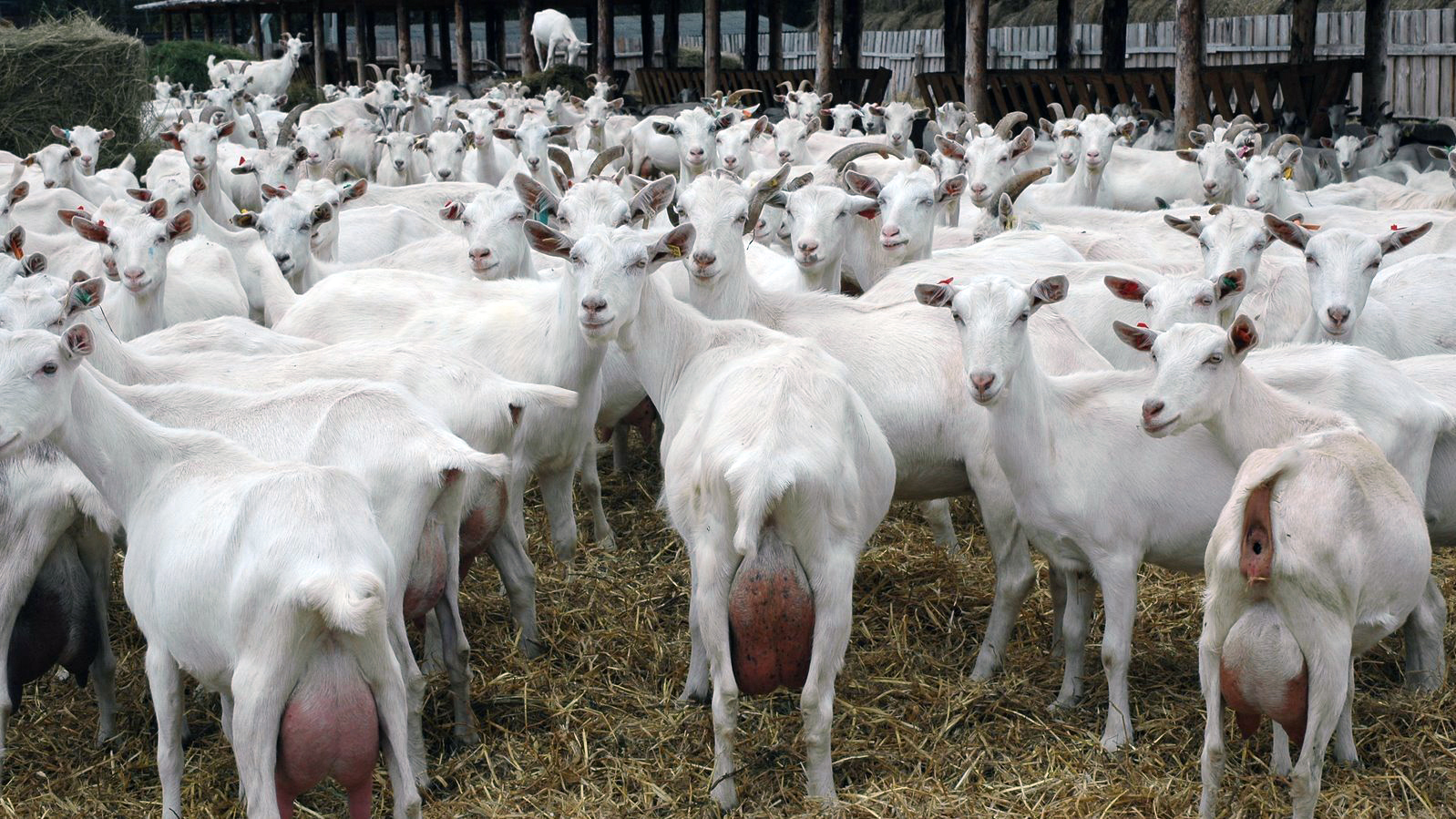
- Flock in a commercial operation in Sernur, in the Mari El Republic of the Russian Federation, showing both horned and hornless animals
- Conservation status: FAO (2007): not at risk; DAD-IS (2026): at risk/vulnerable
- Other names: German: Saanenziege; French: Chèvre de Gessenay; Italian: Capra di Saanen
- Country of origin: Switzerland
- Distribution: worldwide
- Standard: SZZV (German); SZZV (French); SZZV (Italian)
- Use: milk

Traits
- Weight: Male: minimum 85 kg; Female: minimum 60 kg
- Height: Male: 90 cm; Female: 80 cm
- Skin colour: white
- Coat: short, smooth
- Hair colour: white
- Face colour: white
- Horn status: horned or hornless
- Goat; Capra aegagrus hircus

The Saanen (Note: English pronunciation /ˈsɑːnən/; German: Saanenziege, French: Chèvre de Gessenay.) is a Swiss breed of domestic goat. It takes its name from the Saanental in the Bernese Oberland, in the southern part of the Canton of Bern, in western Switzerland. It is a productive dairy goat and is distributed in more than eighty countries worldwide.

== History ==
The Saanen originates in the historic region of Saanen (French: Comté de Gessenay) and in the neighbouring Simmental, both in the Bernese Oberland, in the southern part of the Canton of Bern, in western Switzerland.

It is reported from more than eighty countries. The total world population is reported to be over 900000 head. Of these, some 14000 are in Switzerland.

Since the nineteenth century it has been exported to many countries around the world and has given rise to many local sub-breeds, often through cross-breeding with local goats. Among these local variants are the Banat White in Romania, the British Saanen, the French Saanen, the Israeli Saanen, the Russian White, the Weiße Deutsche Edelziege in Germany, and the Yugoslav Saanen.

A black variant, the Sable Saanen, was recognised as a breed in New Zealand in the 1980s. Since 2005 Saanen stock in the United States of any colour but white or pale cream can be registered as Sable, a distinct breed; it is not reported to the DAD-IS database of the Food and Agriculture Organization of the United Nations.

== Characteristics ==
The Saanen is the largest breed of Swiss goat: billies stand about 90 cm (35 in) at the withers and weigh a minimum of 85 kg (190 lb). It has white skin and a short white coat; some small pigmented areas may be tolerated. It may be horned or hornless and tassels may be present. The profile may be straight or somewhat concave; the ears are erect and point upwards and forwards.

== Use and management ==
The Saanen is the most productive milk goat of Switzerland, which has the most productive milking goats in the world. Average milk yield is 838 kg in a lactation of 264 days. The milk should have a minimum of 3.2% milk-fat and 2.7% milk protein.

The Saanen is not well suited to extensive management, and is usually raised intensively. Being pale-skinned, it does not tolerate strong sun.
