= Capra Grigia =

Swiss breed of domestic goat

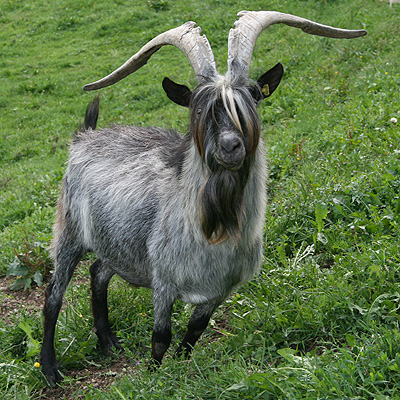
- Billy-goat
- Conservation status: FAO (2007): critical-maintained
- Other names: French: Chèvre grise des montagnes; German: Graue Bergziege; Cavra del Sass
- Country of origin: Switzerland
- Distribution: Grisons; Ticino
- Standard: Capra Grigia Schweiz
- Use: meat; milk; vegetation management

Traits
- Weight: Male: 72 kg; Female: 50 kg
- Height: Male: 80 cm; Female: 75 cm
- Coat: grey, lower legs black
- Face colour: grey with paler muzzle
- Horn status: horned in both sexes
- Goat; Capra aegagrus hircus

The Capra Grigia, French: Chèvre grise des montagnes, German: Graue Bergziege, is a rare and endangered Swiss breed of domestic goat. It originates in the valleys of the cantons of the Grisons or Graubünden in the eastern part of the country, and of Ticino or Tessin in the south. It is possibly related to the grey type of the Passeirer Gebirgsziege from the Autonomous Province of Bolzano in north-eastern Italy.

== History ==
Documentation of the Capra Grigia in the valleys of the Ticino and the Grisons goes back more than 100 years. Three regional types were distinguished: the Bleni-Valmaggia or Lavizzarer, the Liviner or Misoxer, and the Riveria. The breed was not recognised in the reorganisation of Swiss goat breeds in 1938, and infection with caprine arthritis encephalitis in the mid-twentieth century contributed to its near-total disappearance. The Swiss association ProSpecieRara launched a conservation and recovery project for the Capra Grigia in 1997, recorded all surviving members in a herd-book, and started a controlled breeding programme. Breed standards were formulated in 2005, and in 2006 the Capra Grigia was officially recognised as a Swiss breed. In 2007 the total number registered was 190, and the conservation status was listed by the FAO as "critical-maintained". In 2008, five apparently similar goats were discovered in the Valchiavenna in Italy, which increased the gene pool. In 2011 a breed association, Capra Grigia Schweiz, was formed.

At the end of 2011 a population of 475–490 was reported to DAD-IS.

== Characteristics ==
The Capra Grigia is sure-footed and agile, with hard hooves well-suited to the high mountain terrain of the southern Alps. The horns are strong, and grow upwards and outwards. The coat colour is similar to that of the Austrian Blobe Ziege: it varies from a mottled dark grey to a pale silver-white; the legs are dark grey or black, and there is a dark dorsal stripe.

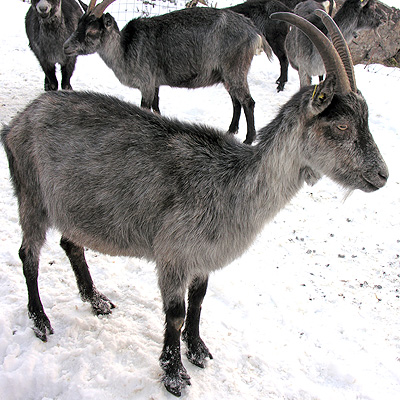
Nanny goat

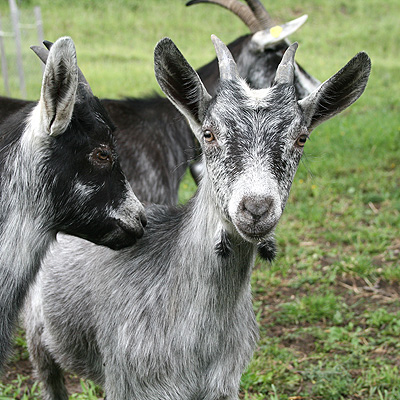
Kids
