= Stiefelgeiss =

Breed of goat

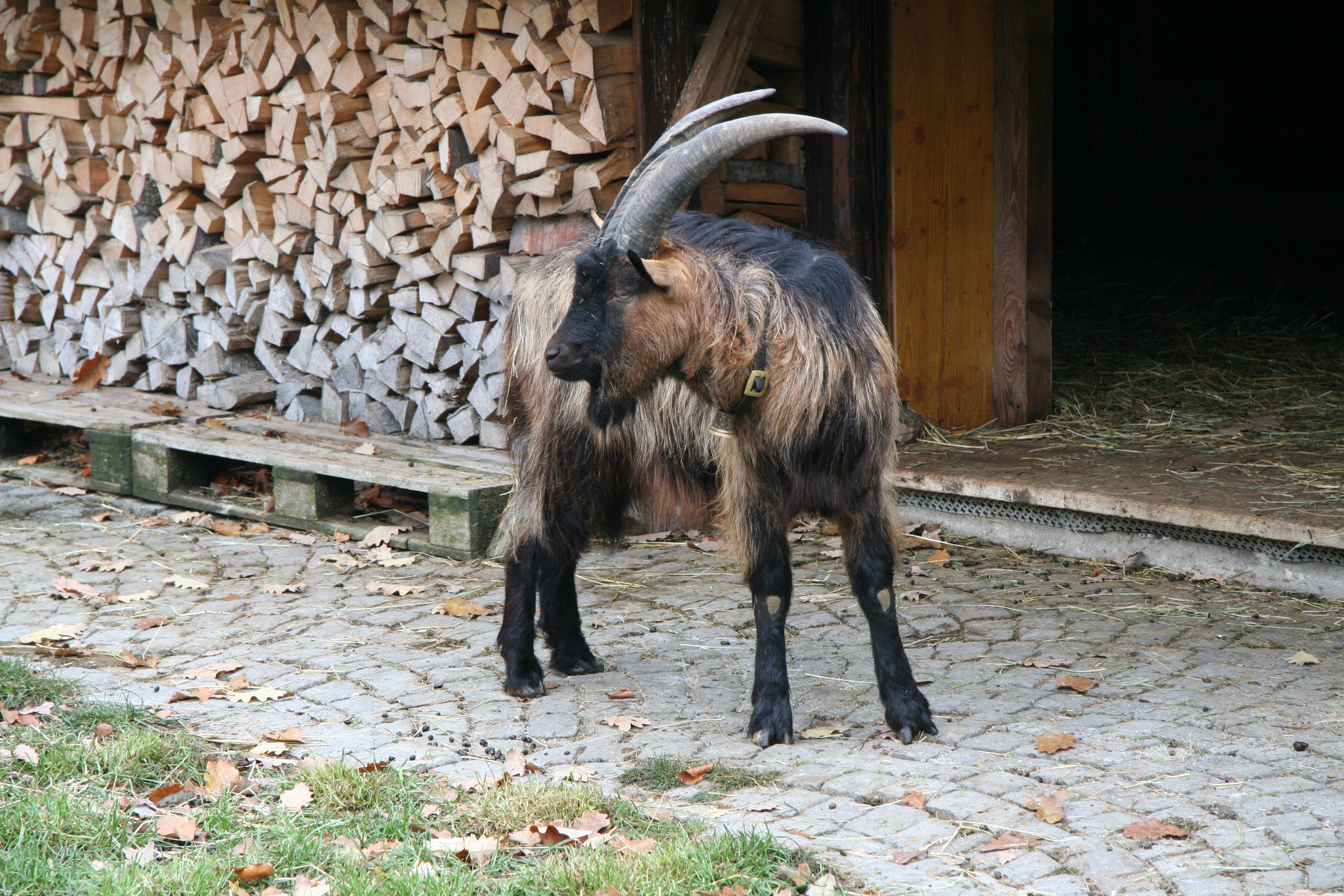
A Stiefelgeiss.

Stiefelgeiss is a breed of domestic mountain goats originating in the highlands of St. Gallen, Switzerland. Their population is currently less than one thousand.

Both male and female Stiefelgeiss goats have horns. Their coats range from a light greyish brown to a dark reddish color. The animals are not excessively shaggy, but on the animals' hind end, long beard hairs, called "Mänteli," grow much longer and often are of a different color from the rest of the coat. Some members of the breed display long, beard-like hairs on the chin.

Until the 1920s, the goat was actively bred, but by the 1980s, it was nearly extinct. Noting this, the Swiss preservation foundation Pro Specie Rara took an interest in the breed. Now mostly managed by the Booted Goat Breeders Club of Switzerland, the ongoing conservation efforts encourage farmers to keep the goats for their agricultural usefulness, for service as mother nannies, and for meat. While still an endangered population, the recent trend in their numbers has been positive. As of 2001, there were 600 members spread among 87 breeders. They are concentrated in eastern Switzerland, with scattered breeding groups also found in the central and western regions of the country.
