= Chamois Coloured goat =

Swiss breed of goat

Chamois Coloured Goat
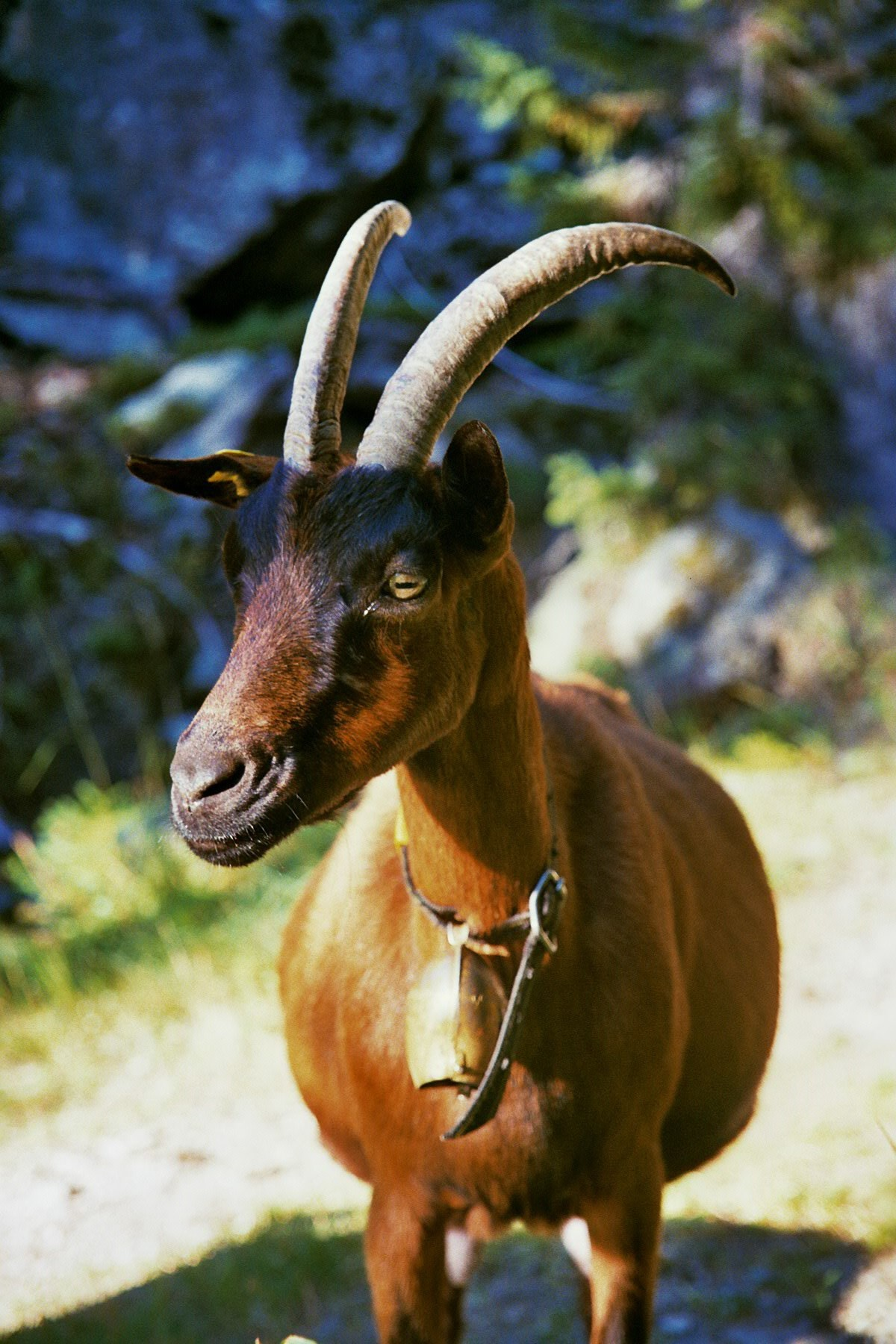
- The horned Grisons type
- Conservation status: FAO (2007): not at risk
- Other names: French: Chèvre chamoisée; German: Gämsfarbige Gebirgsziege; Italian: Camosciata delle Alpi
- Country of origin: Switzerland
- Distribution: Switzerland; Austria; Italy
- Standard: MIPAAF
- Use: milk

Traits
- Weight: Male: minimum 75 kg; Female: minimum 55 kg
- Height: Male: 85 cm; Female: 75 cm
- Coat: brown with black dorsal stripe and lower limbs
- Face colour: brown with black facial stripes
- Horn status: horned and hornless types
- Beard: males bearded
- Goat; Capra aegagrus hircus

The Chamois Coloured Goat, French: Chèvre chamoisée, German: Gämsfarbige Gebirgsziege, Italian: Camosciata delle Alpi, is an indigenous Swiss breed of domestic goat. It is distributed throughout Switzerland and in parts of northern Italy and Austria, and has been exported to other countries including France. There are two strains, a horned type from the Grisons or Graubünden in the eastern part of the country, and a hornless type from the former bezirk of Oberhasli and the area of Brienz and Lake Brienz in the Bernese Oberland in central Switzerland. In some countries it is considered a separate breed called the Oberhasli goat. The Swiss herd-book was established in 1930.

== Registration and numbers ==
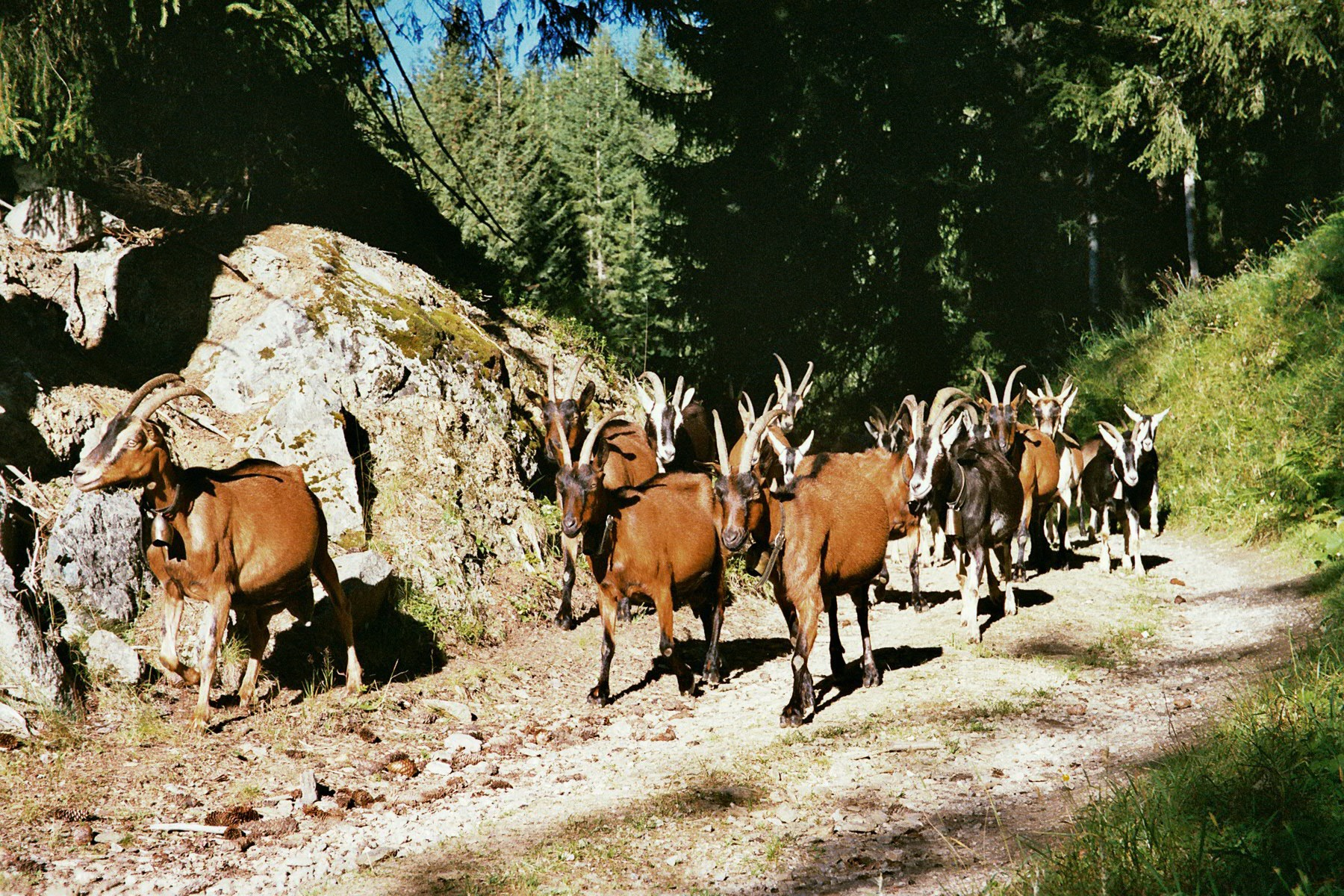
A mixed herd of goats, with Chamois Coloured Goats in the centre, with darker Grisons Striped Goats behind them

In Switzerland the Chamois Coloured Goat is among the principal national goat breeds for which a herd-book is kept by the Schweizerischer Ziegenzuchtverband, the Swiss federation of cantonal goat breeders' associations. In Italy, under the name Camosciata delle Alpi, it is one of the eight autochthonous Italian goat breeds for which a genealogical herd-book is kept by the Associazione Nazionale della Pastorizia, the Italian national association of sheep- and goat-breeders; the Italian herd-book was activated in 1973.

At the end of 2013 the number reported for Switzerland was 13000 and the registered population in Italy was 6237. A population of 2526–3000 was reported from Austria in 2012.

== Characteristics ==
It is a medium-large goat: billies with no less than 75 kg and stand about 85 cm at the shoulder; nannies weigh at least 55 kg and average 75 cm in height. The coat is short and fine; it is russet-brown with black markings to the face, a black dorsal stripe and black on the belly and on the lower limbs; the skin is fine-textured and black.

There are two strains, a horned type from the Grisons or Graubünden in the eastern part of the country, and a hornless type from the former bezirk of Oberhasli and the area of Brienz and Lake Brienz in the Bernese Oberland in central Switzerland.

== Use ==
The milk yield per lactation of the Chamois Coloured Goat in Switzerland is given as >700 kg, with 3.4% fat and 2.9% protein. Measurements made in Italy in 2004 gave figures of 343±115 litres for primiparous, 506±205 litres for secondiparous, and 539±228 litres for pluriparous, nannies, with an average of 3.24% fat and 3.13% protein.
