= Peacock goat =

Breed of goat

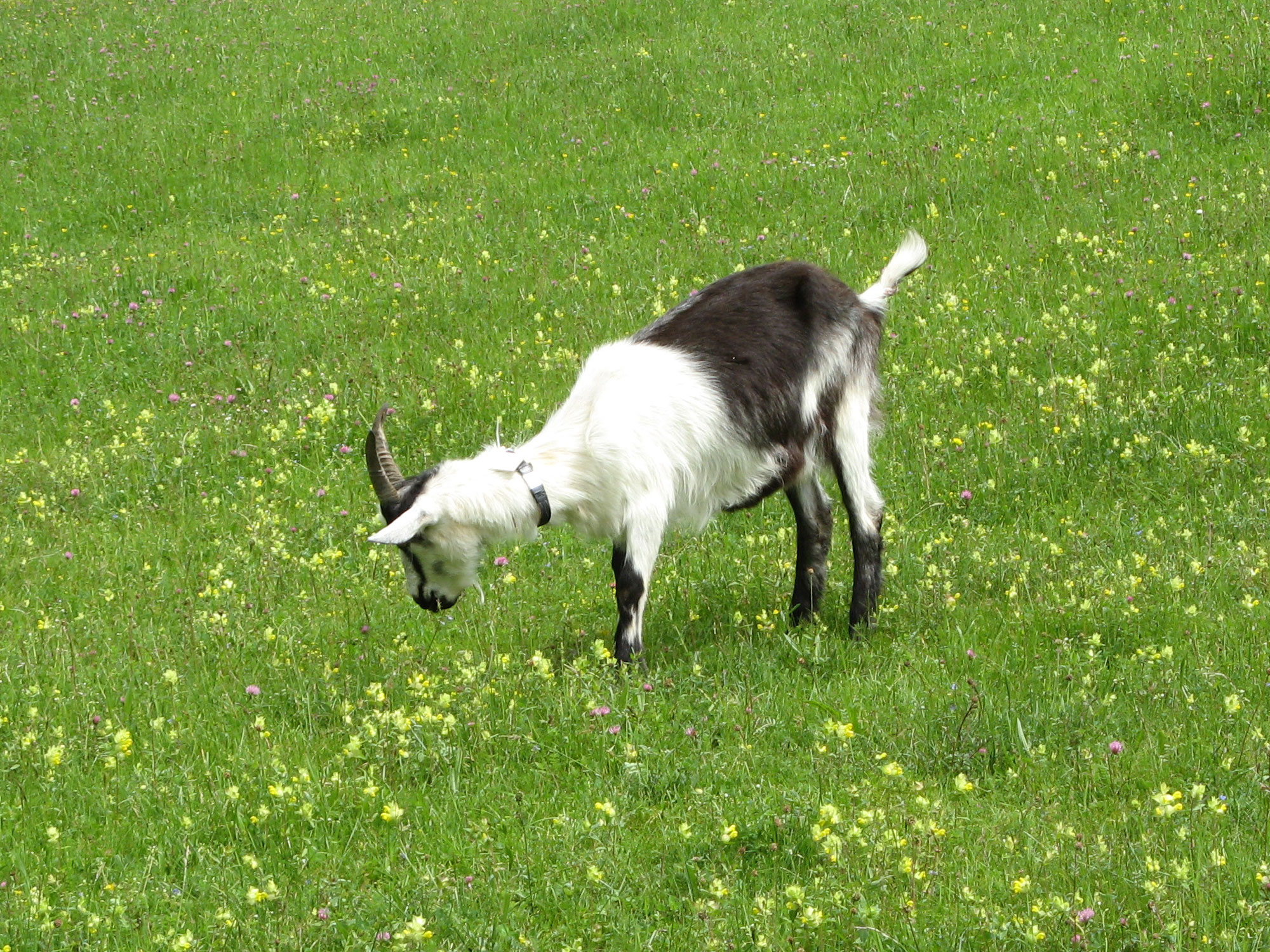
Peacock goat

The Peacock (German: Pfauenziege) goat breed from the cantons of Graubünden and Upper Tessin in Switzerland is used for the production of milk. There is little known about the origin of the peacock goat. The discovery of the peacock goat was in 1887. The name given to it after the discovery was the striped goat (Pfavenziege), but due to a reporter's spelling error, the goat was known as the peacock goat. The peacock goat also goes by the names of the gray-black goat, the gray-black-white mountain goat, and razza naz. The peacock goat is predominantly white with black boots, while the rear half is mostly black. The goat has a thick mid-length coat of hair. It has large horns, and dark facial spots/stripes from the base of the horn, over the eye, and to the nose which gave the breed their original name, the striped goat.

== Sources ==
- Peacock Goat
