= Grisons Striped =

Breed of goat

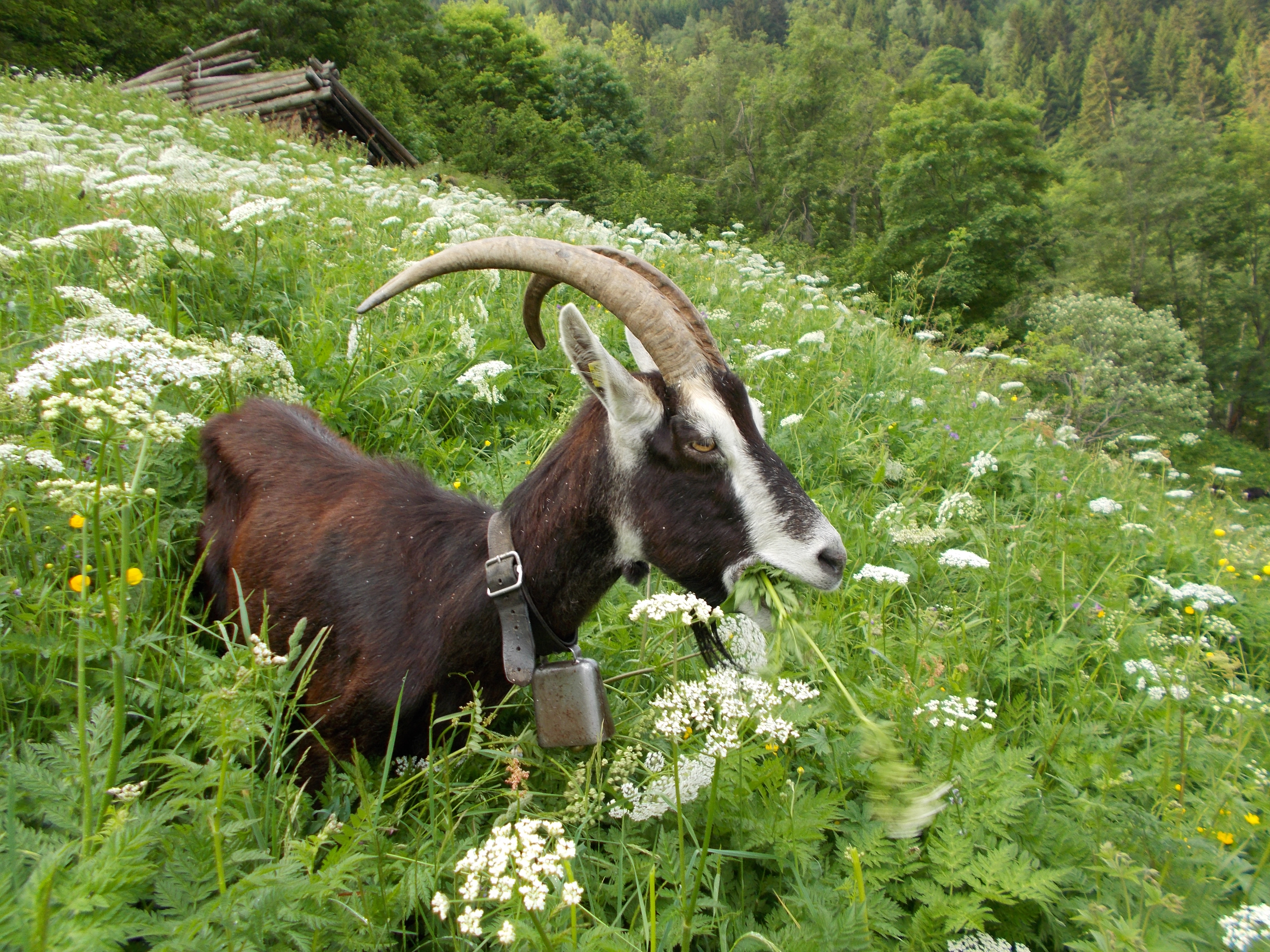

The Grisons Striped is a goat breed from southeast Switzerland. It is very well adapted to mountainous landscapes. Breeders are in the process of selectively breeding it for improved milk production. As of 1991, the breed has mostly remained within Switzerland.
