= Caprine =

Caprine may refer to:

- A goat-antelope
- Caprine, or norleucine, an amino acid
- Ovicaprids, goats and sheep taken together in archaeology and paleontology
- Caprine, an adjective that means "pertaining to or belonging to the subfamily Caprinae" (see goat-antelope, caprine arthritis encephalitis virus)
