= CAE =

CAE may refer to:

== Organisations ==
=== Aviation ===
- CAE Aviation, a Luxembourgish aviation services company
- CAE Inc. (formerly Canadian Aviation Electronics), a Canadian manufacturer of simulation technologies and training provider
- Régional Compagnie Aérienne Européenne, a former subsidiary airline of Air France
- Continental Aviation and Engineering, a US aircraft engine maker that later became Teledyne CAE

=== Economics ===
- Conseil d'Analyse Économique, a French government advisory body

=== Education ===
- Centre for Adult Education, an adult education course provider in Melbourne, Australia
- Center for American Education (disambiguation), an old name for American-style institutions in countries including the UAE and India
- College of Advanced Education, a now abolished tier of Australian tertiary institutions

=== Engineering ===
- Canadian Academy of Engineering, the national academy of Canada for engineering
- Chinese Academy of Engineering, the national academy of the People's Republic of China for engineering, established in 1994
- College of Aeronautical Engineering, part of the Pakistan Air Force Academy

== Science and technology ==
- Compressed air engine, a type of pressure pneumatic actuator using expanding compressed air
- Computer-aided engineering, the broad usage of computer software to aid in engineering analysis tasks
- Caelum (Standard IAU abbreviation), a constellation

=== Computing ===
- Common Application Environment, from X/Open Portability Guide, a specification for Unix-like operating systems
- Computer-aided engineering, computer software to aid in engineering tasks

=== Medicine ===
- Caprine arthritis encephalitis, a disease in goats
- Childhood absence epilepsy, a childhood seizure disorder
- Carbonic anhydrase enzyme, that catalyzes the interconversion between carbon dioxide and water and the dissociated ions of carbonic acid

== Media ==
- Critical Art Ensemble, collective of tactical media practitioners of various specializations
- Radio Canadian Army Europe, Radio CAE, from World War II and the 1950s & 1960s, now replaced by Canadian Forces Radio and Television

== Places ==
- Columbia Metropolitan Airport (IATA airport code), West Columbia, South Carolina, United States
- Central African Empire, a short-lived empire in Central Africa
- Caernarfonshire (Chapman code), historic county in Wales

== Other uses ==
- Certificate in Advanced English, the fourth level of the University of Cambridge ESOL examination
- Chief audit executive, or Director of audit, a high level independent executive with overall responsibility for internal audit
- Child Abduction Emergency (SAME code), or AMBER Alert
- Canadian Arctic Expedition, 1913–1916, a Canadian Arctic Expedition
