= George Jacobs (educator) =

American educator and vegan activist (born 1952)

- Born: US
- Occupation: Educator
- Years active: 1969–present
- Spouse: Fong Cheng Hong (m. 1989)
- Children: n/a
- Website: georgejacobs.net

Dr. George Jacobs (born 1952) is a well-known educator and vegan activist in Singapore.

== Early life ==
- Born in the United States in 1952
- Jacobs went to Metuchen High School, Metuchen, New Jersey, United States

== Career ==
- 1980: Bachelor of Arts, University of Illinois at Chicago, United States
- 1982: Master of Arts, University of Illinois at Chicago, United States
- 1991: Doctor of Philosophy (PhD), University of Hawaiʻi, United States
- 2003–2013; 2015– President, Vegetarian Society (Singapore)
- 1993–present: Teaching for Southeast Asian Ministers of Education Organization, Ministry of Education, Center for American Education, James Cook University Singapore

== Personal life ==
- Became Vegetarian in 1980, in recent years, George has switched to a vegan diet.
- George is married with Dr. Fong Cheng Hong

=== Books (selection) and Publications (selection) ===
To date, George Jacobs has authored/co-authored the following books:

New Asian Traditions Vegetarian Cookbook, ISBN 9812480560 by Amy, Susan; Kiran Narain & George Jacobs

The Heart Smart Oil Free Cookbook, ISBN 978-9814342292 by Mayura Mohta & George Jacobs Jacobs, G. M., Yeow, R., Lau, M., Loh, S., Chan, M., & Priyathanaa. (2013). Action research toolkit (ART). Singapore: Boys’ Town.

Jacobs, G. M., & Kimura, H. (2013). Cooperative learning and teaching. In the series, English language teacher development. Alexandria, VA: TESOL (Teachers of English to Speakers of Other Languages).

Jacobs, G. M., & Farrell, T. S. C. (2012). Teachers sourcebook for extensive reading. Charlotte, NC: Information Age Publishing.

Farrell, T. S. C., & Jacobs, G. M. (2010). Essentials for successful language teaching. New York, NY: Continuum.

Jacobs, G. M., & Goh, C. M. C. (2007). Cooperative learning in the language classroom. Singapore: SEAMEO Regional Language Centre.

McCafferty, S., Jacobs, G. M., & Iddings, C. (Eds.). (2006). Cooperative learning and second language teaching. New York: Cambridge University Press. http://www.cambridge.org/catalogue/catalogue.asp?isbn=052184486X&ss=fro

Loh, W. I., & Jacobs, G. M. (2003). Nurturing the naturalist intelligence. San Clemente, CA: Kagan Publications.

Lie, A., Jacobs, G. M., & Amy, S. (Eds.). (2002). English via environmental education. Jakarta: Grasindo.

Rajan, S. B. R., Jacobs, G. M., Loh, W. I., & Ward, C. S. (2002). English in focus: A lower secondary guide. Singapore: Pearson Education.

Jacobs, G. M., Power, M. A., & Loh, W. I. (2002). The teacher's sourcebook for cooperative learning: Practical techniques, basic principles, and frequently asked questions. Thousand Oaks, CA: Corwin Press. http://www.corwinpress.com/booksProdDesc.nav?prodId=Book220803. Translated into Japanese (visit http://www.amazon.co.jp to order), Chinese and Korean

Loh, W. I., & Jacobs, G. M. (2002). Science made easy (Primary 4). Singapore: Longman.

Jacobs, G. M., & Loh, W. I. (2002). Grammar in use (Workbook 4). Singapore: Learners Publishing.

Jacobs, G. M., & Loh, W. I. (2002). Grammar in use (Workbook 3). Singapore: Learners Publishing.

Jacobs, G. M., & Loh, W. I. (2001). Grammar in use (Workbook 2). Singapore: Learners Publishing.

Jacobs, G. M., & Loh, W. I. (2001). Grammar in use (Workbook 1). Singapore: Learners Publishing.

Jacobs, G. M., & Loh, W. I. (2001). Read aloud Asia. Singapore: Times Media.

Loh, W. I., & Jacobs, G. M. (2001). Science made easy (Primary 3). Singapore: Longman.

Loh, W. I., & Jacobs, G. M. (2000). Little Sammy (a set of six preschool readers). Singapore: Singapore National Press.

Jacobs, G. M., & Loh, W. I. (2000). Little observers (a set of six preschool readers). Singapore: Singapore National Press.

Renandya, W. A., & Jacobs, G. M. (Eds.). (1998). Learners and language learning. Singapore: SEAMEO Regional Language Centre.

Jacobs, G. M., Kumarasamy, P., Nopparat, P., & Amy, S. (1998). Linking language and the environment. Toronto: Pippin.

Jacobs, G. M., Gan, S. L., & Ball, J. (1997). Learning cooperative learning via cooperative learning: A sourcebook of lesson plans for teacher education. San Clemente, CA: Kagan Cooperative Learning. [Also translated into Chinese and Malay.]

Jacobs, G. M., Davis, C., & Renandya, W. A. (Eds.). (1997). Successful strategies for extensive reading. Singapore: SEAMEO Regional Language Centre.

Jacobs, G. M. (ed.). (1997). Language classrooms of tomorrow: Issues and responses. Singapore: SEAMEO Regional Language Centre.

Jacobs, G. M., & Sundara Rajan, B. R. (Eds.). (1996). Stories for language teacher education. Singapore: SEAMEO Regional Language Centre.

Hidalgo, A.C., Hall, D., & Jacobs, G. M. (Eds.). (1995). Getting started: Materials writers on materials writing. Singapore: SEAMEO Regional Language Centre.

Jacobs, G. M. (1993). Integrating environmental education in second language instruction. Singapore: SEAMEO Regional Language Centre.

Jacobs, G. M., & Power, M. A. (1991). Putting it all together. Ann Arbor, MI: University of Michigan Press.

And the following publications about him:

- Personal interview with George Jacobs: "Going green for life"
- Interview with Dr. George Jacobs about the "controversy over cooperative learning".

== See also ==
- List of vegans
- Vegetarian Society (Singapore)
