= Ovicaprid =

archaeozoologists have struggled to find morphological criteria that allow them to reliably distinguish between the bones of these two closely related taxa

— Zeder and Lapham, 2010

In zooarchaeology and paleontology, ovicaprids or caprines are domestic sheep and goats taken together.

Distinguishing sheep and goats from post-cranial skeletal remains has historically been difficult, so in many archaeological reports, the two are often reported in a single ovis/capra category. This is problematic because of their different roles in early animal husbandry.

Nonetheless, experienced analysts using systematic criteria can distinguish the two with high reliability. They can also be distinguished using DNA analysis or collagen fingerprinting. Collagen has the advantage of surviving longer than DNA.
