= Vegetarian Society (Singapore) =

Non-profit organisation promoting vegetarianism

- Founded: 1999
- Purpose: Promote vegetarianism among the public and support and link individuals and organisations that practise, promote or endorse vegetarianism
- Location: Singapore
- Region served: Singapore
- Key people: George Jacobs
- Website: vegetarian-society.org

Vegetarian Society (Singapore) or VSS is a non-profit, non-denominational organisation. The Singapore-registered charity was established in 1999 to "Promote vegetarianism among the public and support and link individuals and organizations that practise, promote or endorse vegetarianism". VSS is the largest community for vegetarianism, veganism or any form of semi-vegetarianism in Singapore. Promoting a plant-based diet is one of the main goals.

VSS is a member of the International Vegetarian Union (IVU) and the Asian Vegetarian Union (AVU) to synchronise within the global context.

== Events ==
=== Past events ===
- January 2007: 1st Southeast Asia Vegetarian Congress 2007, Batam, Indonesia

=== Publications ===
- July 2015: Going green for life, Food confidential in the Singapore Press Holdings, an interview with Dr. George Jacobs.
- April 2015: More choices for Vegetarians in the Singapore Press Holdings with President George Jacobs and Secretary Pauline Menezes

=== Campaigns ===
- 2010: Helped to start Veggie Thursday, a project of 25+ Singapore organisations. Veggie Thursday promotes increased consumption of plant-based foods.

In 2014, Vegetarian Society started a two-week $50,000 poster campaign with advertisement posted on SMRT's Mass Rapid Transit (MRT) interchange stations. The campaign sought to challenge people to think about their meat eating practices.

== Notable people and alumni ==
- George Jacobs, president of VSS, served from 2003 to 2012 and again from: 2015–

== See also ==
- EarthFest Singapore
- List of vegetarian and vegan festivals
- List of vegetarian and vegan organizations
- International Vegetarian Union
- Vegetarian Society
- List of vegetarian and vegan restaurants

== Bibliography ==
- Annual Reports of the Vegetarian Society (Singapore) 2008–2014 "Annual Reports VSS". Archived from the original on 5 September 2015.
- Singapore Vegetarian Food Guide, ISBN 978-981-08-7868-9 by the Vegetarian Society (Singapore)
