= Caprine arthritis encephalitis virus =

Virus classification
- (unranked): Virus
- Realm: Riboviria
- Kingdom: Pararnavirae
- Phylum: Artverviricota
- Class: Revtraviricetes
- Order: Ortervirales
- Family: Retroviridae
- Genus: Lentivirus
- Species: Lentivirus capartenc

Species of virus

Caprine arthritis encephalitis virus (CAEV) is a retrovirus which infects goats and cross-reacts immunologically with HIV. CAEV cannot be transmitted to humans, including through the consumption of milk from an infected goat. There is no evidence that CAEV can cure HIV in humans.

CAEV is commonly transferred within the goat species by ingestion of colostrum or milk from an infected goat, and to a lesser extent, cross-species CAEV transfer by sheep is possible.

== Symptoms ==
CAEV adversely affects the immune system of its host, causing a disease known as caprine arthritis encephalitis. Common symptoms resulting from CAEV infection include arthritis, pneumonia, indurative mastitis, and encephalitis. One of the first and most common signs of CAEV infection is weight loss. However, many goats will not show any symptoms. Goats that do show symptoms may display swollen knee or carpal joints, lose body condition, and develop a rough hair coat. Pregnant and nursing goats will display a "hard udder", which is firm and swollen, and produce little milk.
