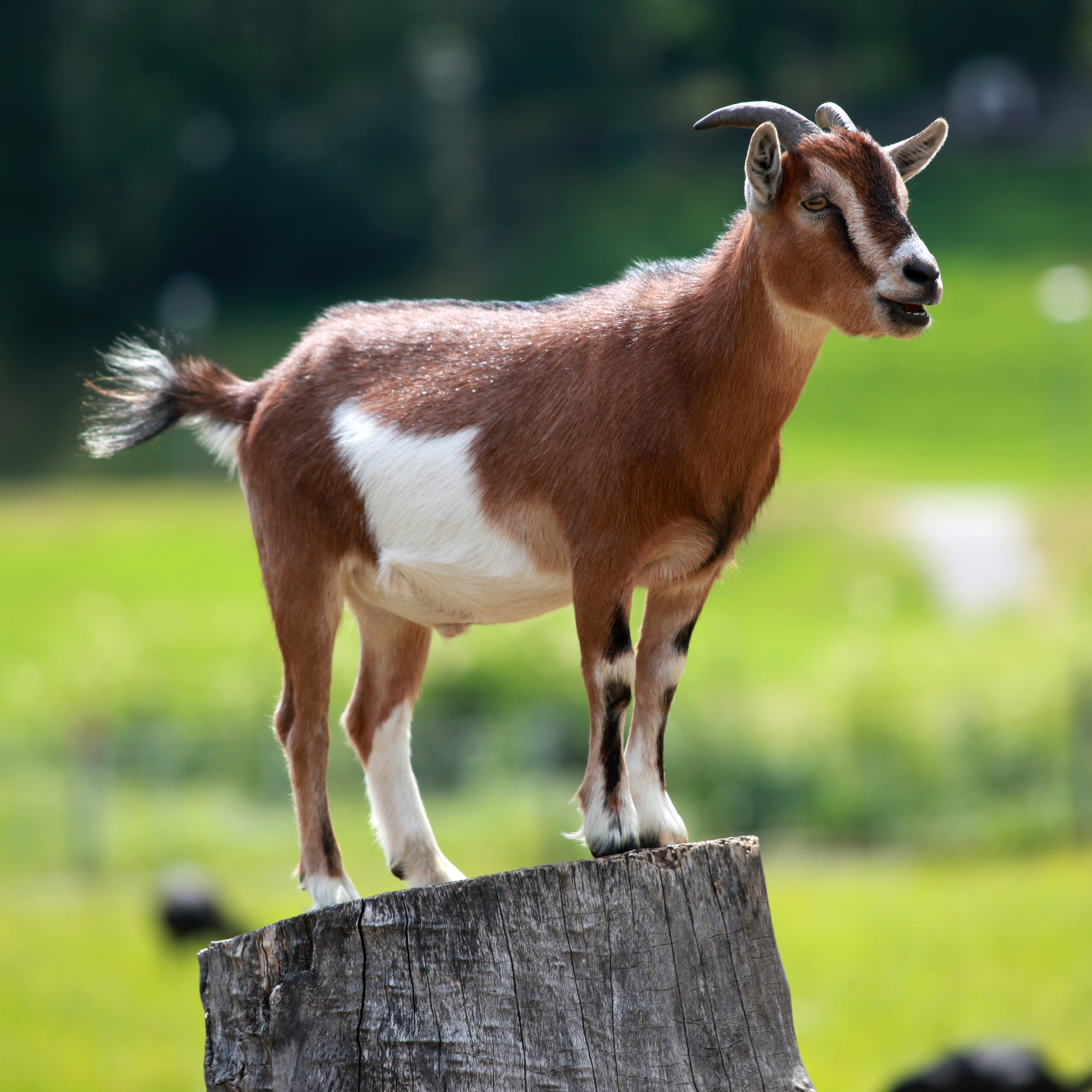
- A pygmy goat on a tree stump

Conservation status
- Domesticated

Scientific classification
- Kingdom: Animalia
- Phylum: Chordata
- Class: Mammalia
- Order: Artiodactyla
- Family: Bovidae
- Subfamily: Caprinae
- Genus: Capra
- Species: C. hircus

Binomial name
- Capra hircus Linnaeus, 1758

Synonyms
- Capra aegagrus hircus Linnaeus, 1758; Capra depressa Linnaeus, 1758; Capra mambrica Linnaeus, 1758; Capra reversa Linnaeus, 1758

= Goat =

Domestic goat Temporal range: 0.01–0 Ma Neolithic–Recent

Species of domesticated mammal

The goat or domestic goat (Capra hircus) is a species of caprine that is mostly kept as livestock. It was domesticated from the wild goat (C. aegagrus) of Southwest Asia and Eastern Europe. The goat is a member of the family Bovidae and is closely related to the sheep. It was one of the first animals to be domesticated, in Iran around 10,000 years ago.

Goats are raised in many parts of the world, with products including goat milk, goat cheese, goatskin, goat meat, and wool. In 2022, there were more than 1.1 billion goats living in the world, of which 150 million were in India.

Goats feature in mythology, folklore, and religion in many parts of the world, including in the Greek myth of Amalthea, in the goats that pulled the chariot of the Norse god Thor, in the Scandinavian Yule goat, in Hinduism's goat-headed Daksha, in the Israelite ritual of the scapegoat, and in Christianity as a common depiction of Satan, among others.

== Etymology ==
The Modern English word goat comes from Old English gāt 'goat, she-goat', which in turn derives from Proto-Germanic *gaitaz (cf. Dutch/Frisian/Icelandic/Norwegian geit, German Geiß, and Gothic gaits), ultimately from Proto-Indo-European *ǵʰaidos meaning "young goat" (cf. Latin haedus 'kid'). To refer to the male goat, Old English used bucca (cf. Dutch/Frisian bok, modern English buck) until ousted by hegote, hegoote ('he-goat') in the late 12th century. Nanny goat (adult female) originated in the 18th century, and billy goat (adult male) in the 19th century. Female goats, like other various animals, are also called does.

Castrated males are called wethers. While the words hircine and caprine both refer to anything having a goat-like quality, hircine is used most often to emphasize the distinct smell of domestic goats.

Juvenile goats are called kids, a term derived from a Scandinavian language, such as Old Norse kið/kith, with the same meaning. It has been a slang term for human children since the 1590s, and established as an informal term since the 1840s.

== History ==
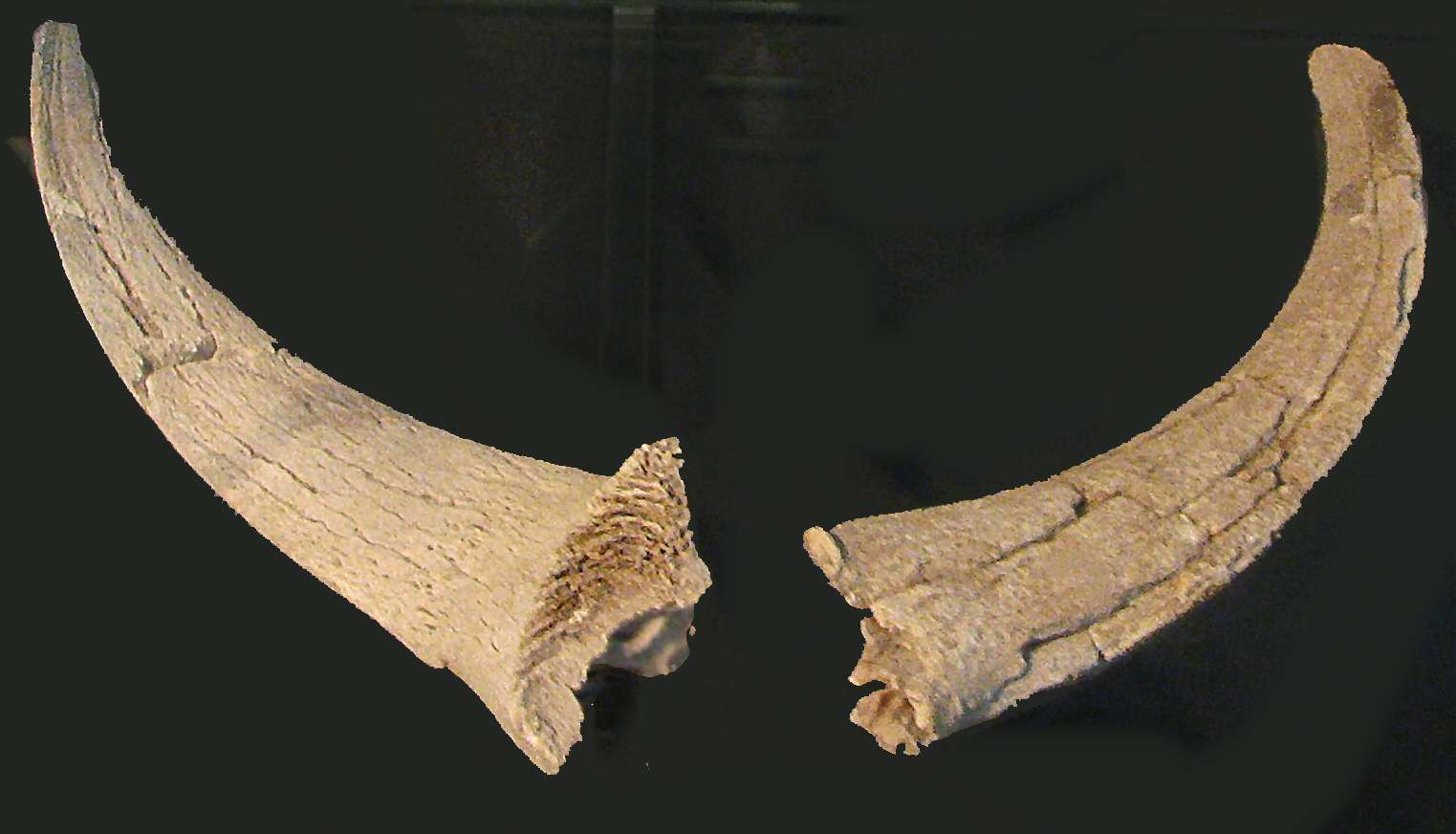
Horn cores from the Neolithic village of Atlit Yam, between 6900 and 6300 BC

Goats are among the earliest animals to have been domesticated by humans. A genetic analysis confirms the archaeological evidence that the wild bezoar ibex, found today in the Zagros Mountains, but formerly widespread in Anatolia, is the likely original ancestor of all or most domestic goats today.

Neolithic farmers began to herd wild goats primarily for easy access to milk and meat, as well as to their dung, which was used as fuel; and their bones, hair, and sinew were used for clothing, building, and tools. The earliest remnants of domesticated goats, dating 10,000 years Before Present, are found in Ganj Dareh in Iran. Goat remains have been found at archaeological sites in Jericho, Choga Mami, Djeitun, and Çayönü, dating the domestication of goats in Western Asia at between 8,000 and 9,000 years ago. DNA evidence suggests that goats were domesticated around 10,000 years ago. Historically, goat hide has been used to form wineskin bottles for water and wine and to produce parchment.

== Biology ==
=== Description ===
Each breed of goat has specific weight ranges, which vary from more than 140 kg (310 lb) for bucks of larger breeds such as the Boer, to 20 to 27 kg (44 to 60 lb) for smaller does. Within each breed, different strains or bloodlines may have different recognized sizes. At the bottom of the size range are miniature breeds such as the African Pygmy, which stand 41 to 58 cm (16 to 23 in) at the shoulder as adults.

Most goats naturally have two horns, their shape and size depending on the breed. There have been incidents of polycerate goats (having as many as eight horns), although this is a genetic rarity. Unlike cattle, goats have not been successfully bred to be reliably polled, as the genes determining sex and those determining horns are closely linked. Breeding together two genetically polled goats results in a high number of intersex individuals among the offspring, which are typically sterile. Their horns are made of living bone surrounded by keratin and other proteins, and are used for defense, dominance, territoriality, and thermoregulation. Both male and female goats may have beards, and many types of goat (most commonly dairy goats, dairy-cross Boers, and pygmy goats) may have wattles, one dangling from each side of the neck. Goats have horizontal, slit-shaped pupils, allowing them to see well in both well-lit and dark conditions, as well as giving them a wide field of vision on either side to detect predators while avoiding being dazzled by sunlight from above. Goats have no tear ducts.

Goats are ruminants. They have a four-chambered stomach consisting of the rumen, the reticulum, the omasum, and the abomasum. As with other mammal ruminants, they are even-toed ungulates. The females have an udder consisting of two teats, in contrast to cattle, which have four teats. An exception to this is the Boer goat, which sometimes may have up to eight teats. Goats are diploid with two sets of 30 chromosomes.

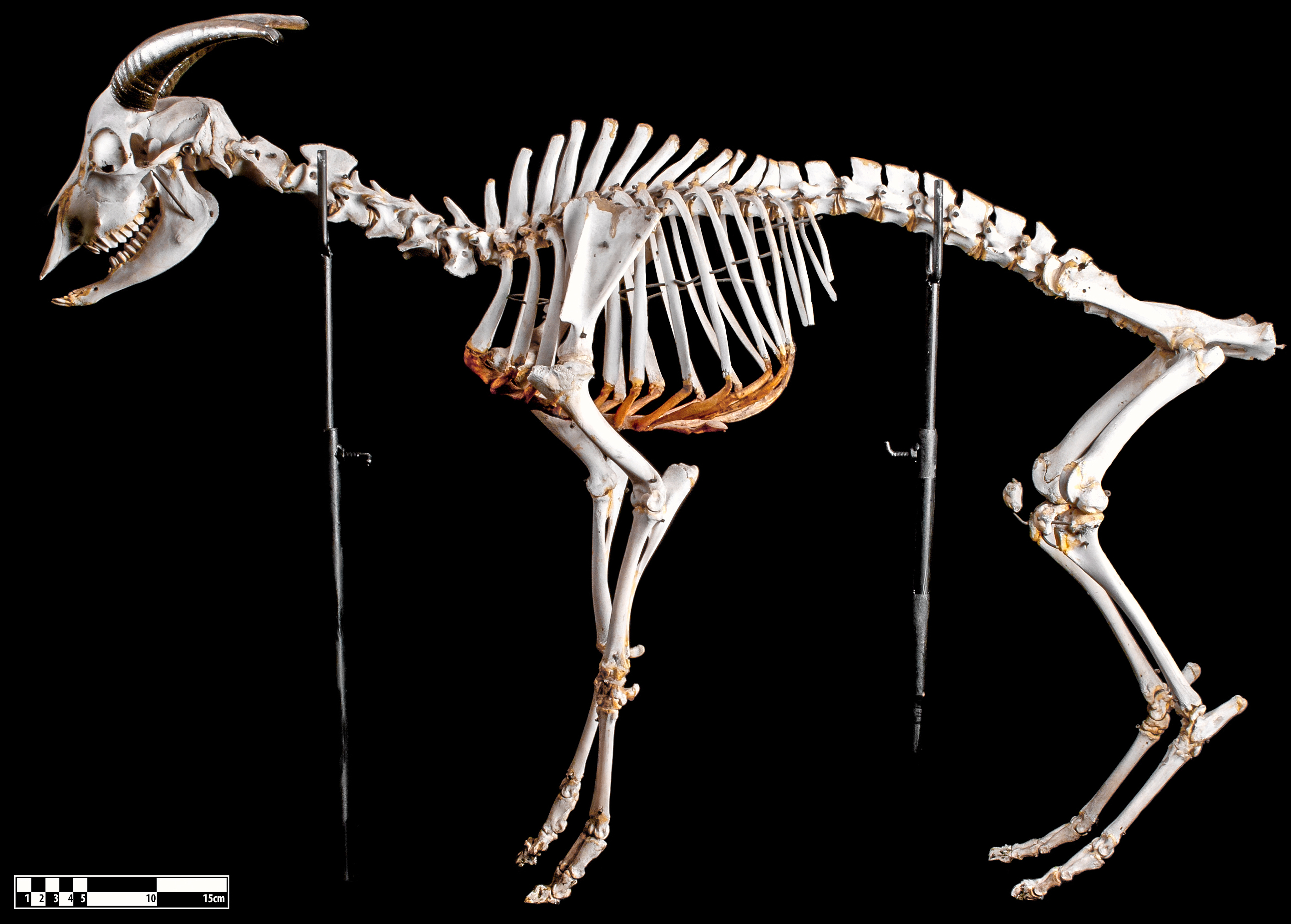
Skeleton

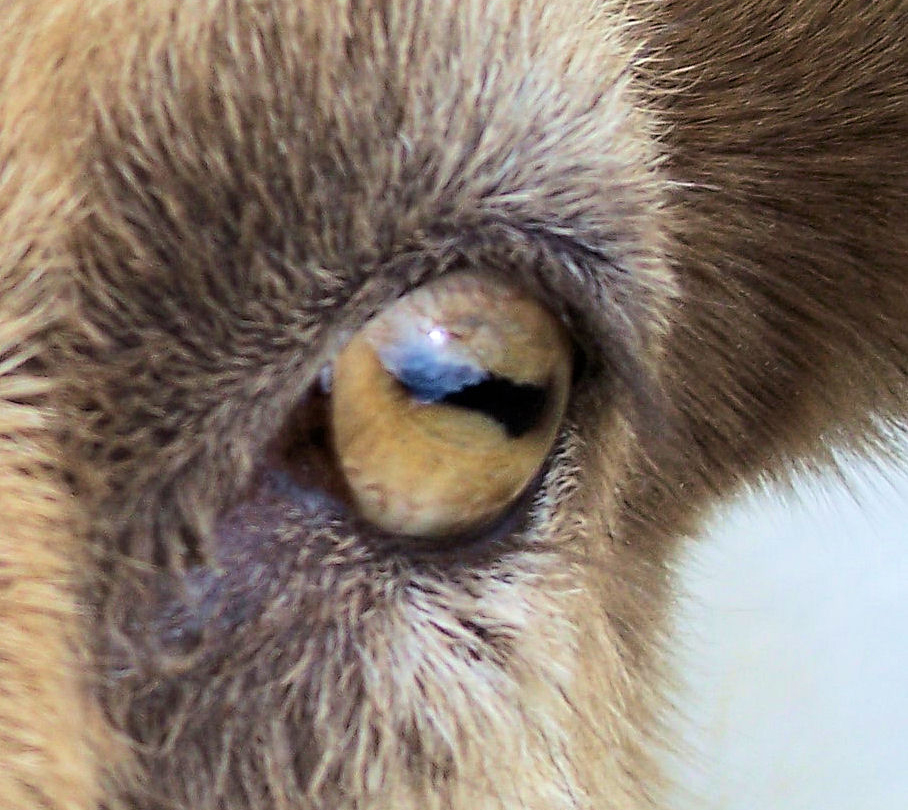
Eye with horizontal pupil

=== Comparison with sheep ===
Sheep and goats are closely related: both are in the subfamily Caprinae. However, they are separate species, so hybrids rarely occur and are always infertile. A hybrid of a ewe and a buck is called a sheep-goat hybrid. Visual differences between sheep and goats include the beard of goats and the divided upper lip of sheep. Sheep tails hang down, even when short or docked, while the short tails of goats are held upwards. Sheep breeds are often naturally polled (either in both sexes or just in the female), while naturally polled goats are rare (though many are polled artificially). Males of the two species differ in that buck goats acquire a unique and strong odor during the rut, whereas rams do not.

== Behavior and ecology ==
Goats are naturally curious. They are agile and able to climb and balance in precarious places. This makes them the only ruminant to regularly climb trees. These behaviours have made them notorious for escaping their pens by testing fences and enclosures. If any of the fencing can be overcome, goats almost inevitably escape. Goats are as intelligent as dogs by some studies. When handled as a group, goats display less herding behavior than sheep. When grazing undisturbed, they spread across the field or range, rather than feed side by side as do sheep. When nursing young, goats leave their kids separated ("lying out") rather than clumped, as do sheep. They generally turn and face an intruder, and bucks are more likely to charge or butt at humans than are rams. A 2016 study reports that goats try to communicate with people like domesticated animals such as dogs and horses. They look to a human for assistance when faced with a newly modified challenge.

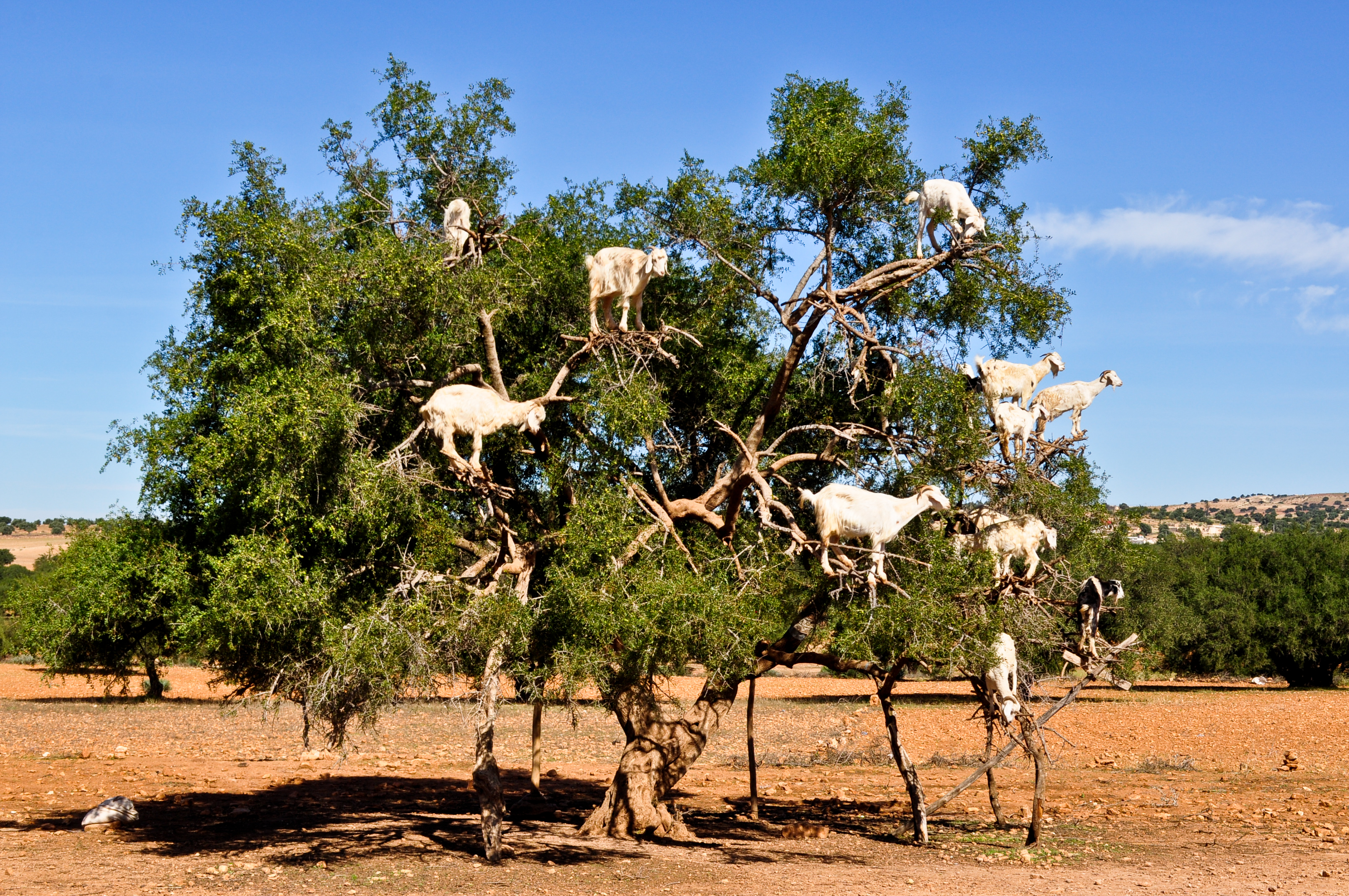
Goats grazing in an argan tree, Morocco

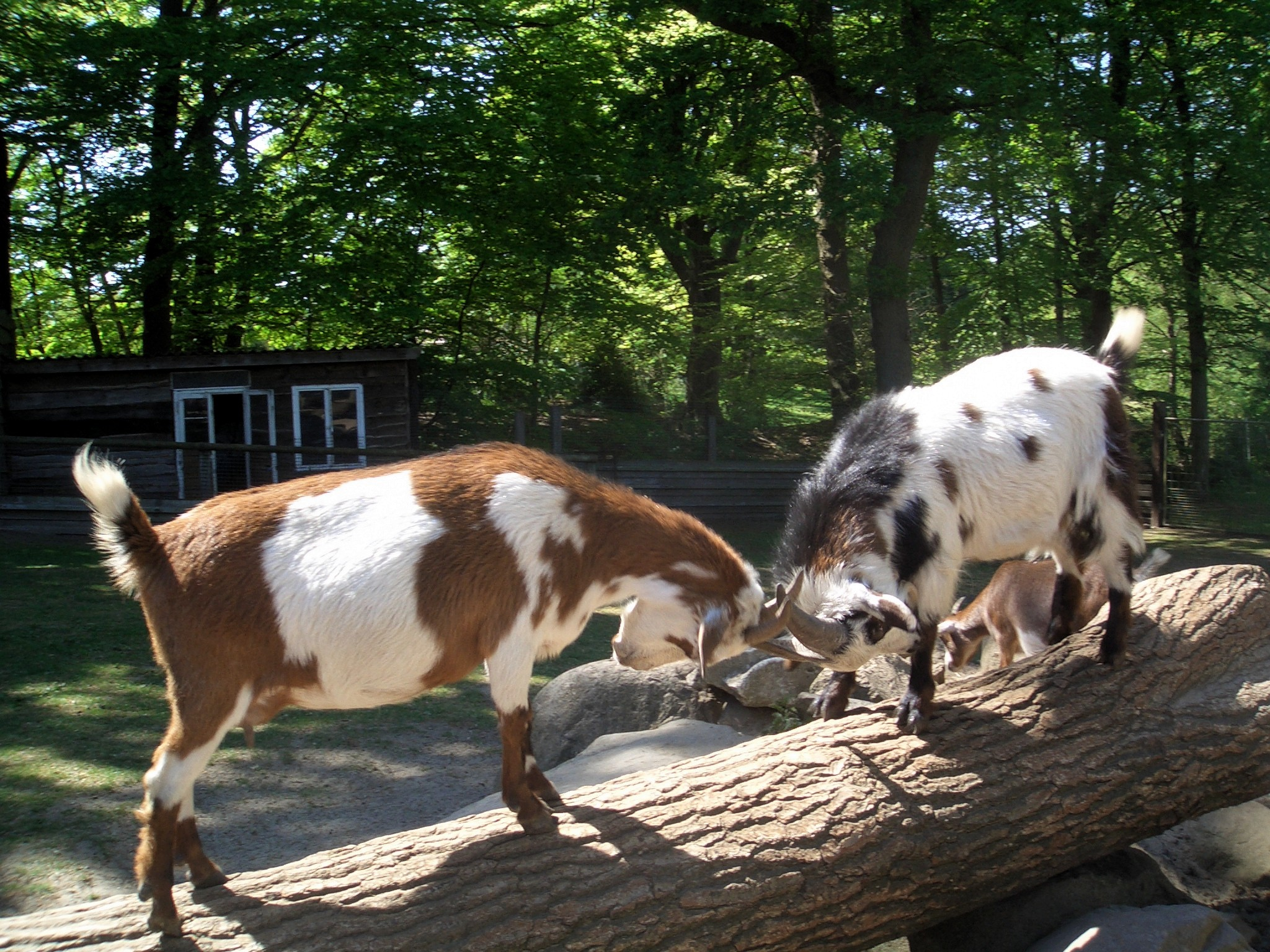
Goats establishing a dominance hierarchy through head butting

Herd browsing together in Japan

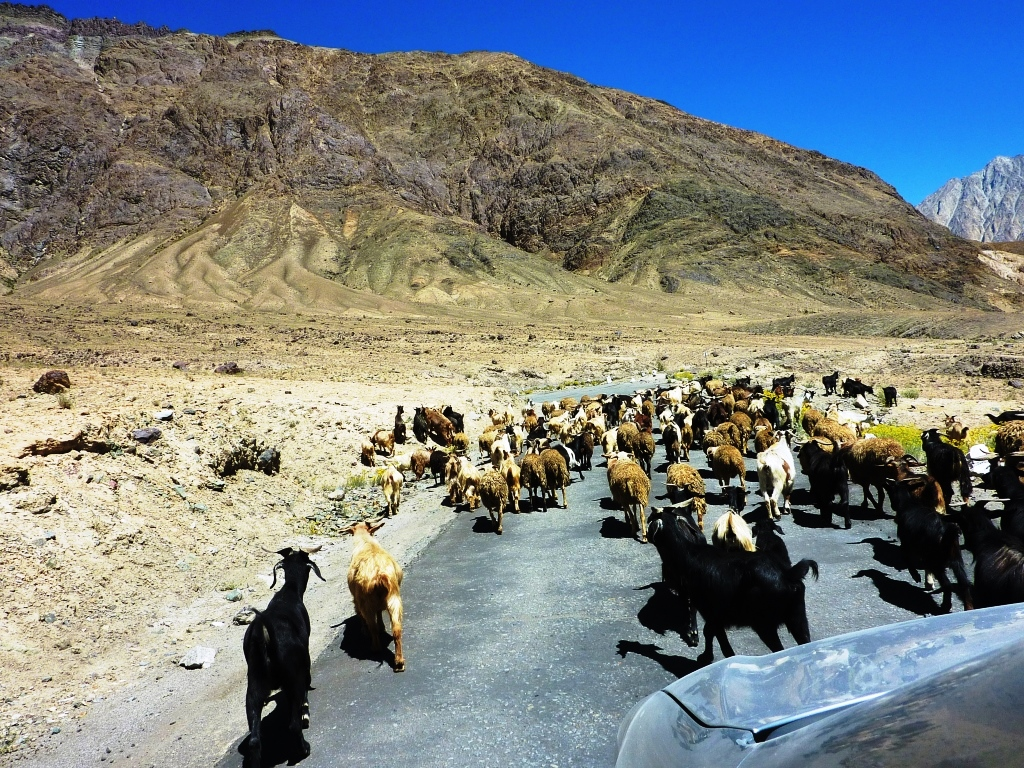
Moving a herd on a road in Ladakh

=== Reproduction ===
Goats reach puberty between three and 15 months of age, depending on breed and nutritional status. Many breeders prefer to postpone breeding until the doe has reached 70% of the adult weight, but this separation is rarely possible in extensively managed, open-range herds.

Bucks (uncastrated males) of Swiss and northern breeds come into rut in the fall as with the does' heat cycles. Bucks of equatorial breeds may show seasonal reduced fertility, but as with the does, are capable of breeding at all times. Rut is characterized by a decrease in appetite and obsessive interest in the does. A buck in rut displays flehmen lip curling and urinates on his forelegs and face. Sebaceous scent glands at the base of the horns add to the male goat's odor, which is important to make him attractive to the female. Some does will not mate with a buck which has had its scent glands removed.

Gestation length is approximately 150 days. Twins are the usual result, with single and triplet births also common. Less frequent are litters of quadruplet, quintuplet, and even sextuplet kids. Birthing, known as kidding, generally occurs uneventfully. Just before kidding, the doe will have a sunken area around the tail and hip, as well as heavy breathing. She may have a worried look, become restless and display great affection for her keeper. The mother often eats the placenta, which gives her much-needed nutrients, helps stanch her bleeding, and parallels the behavior of wild herbivores, such as deer, to reduce the lure of the birth scent for predators.

Freshening (coming into milk production) usually occurs at kidding, although milk production is also relatively common in unbred doelings of dairy breeds. Milk production varies with the breed, age, quality, and diet of the doe; dairy goats generally produce between 680 and 1,810 kg (1,500 and 4,000 lb) of milk per 305-day lactation. On average, a good quality dairy doe will give at least 3 kg (6 lb) of milk per day while she is in milk. A first-time milker may produce less, or as much as 7 kg (16 lb), or more of milk in exceptional cases. After the lactation, the doe will "dry off", typically after she has been bred. Occasionally, goats that have not been bred and are continuously milked will continue lactation beyond the typical 305 days. Male lactation sometimes occurs in goats.

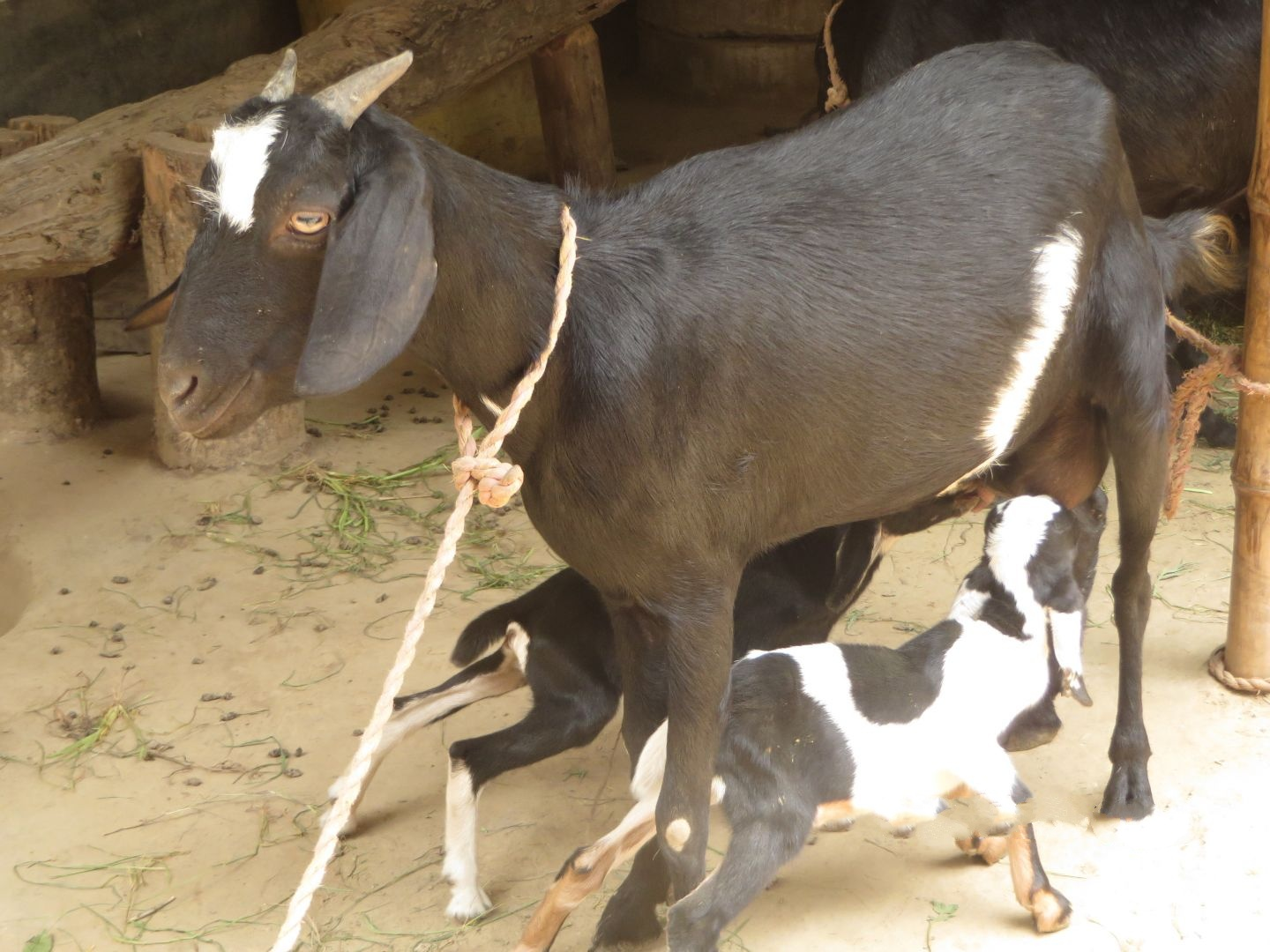
Female suckling two kids

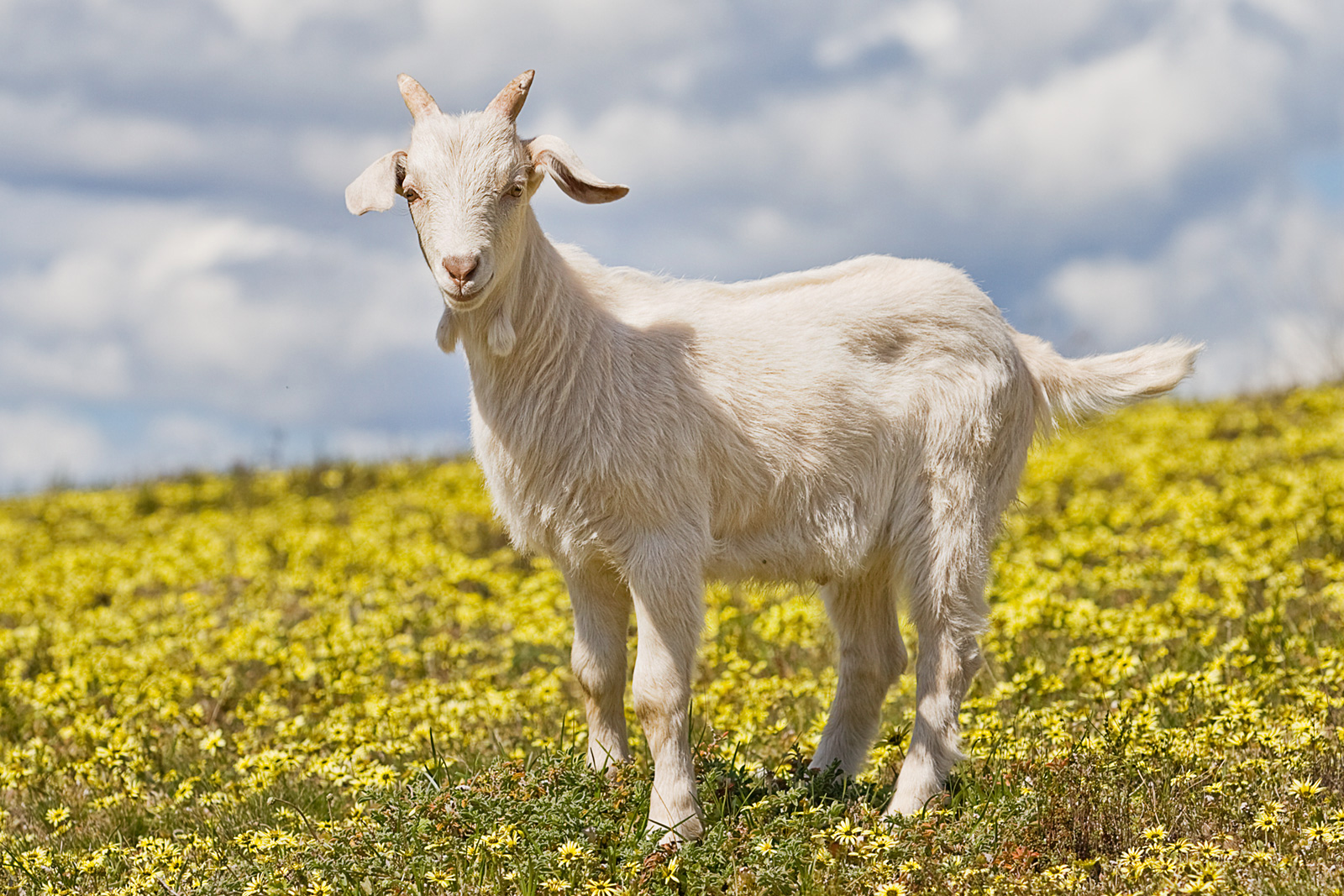
A two-month-old kid in a field of capeweed

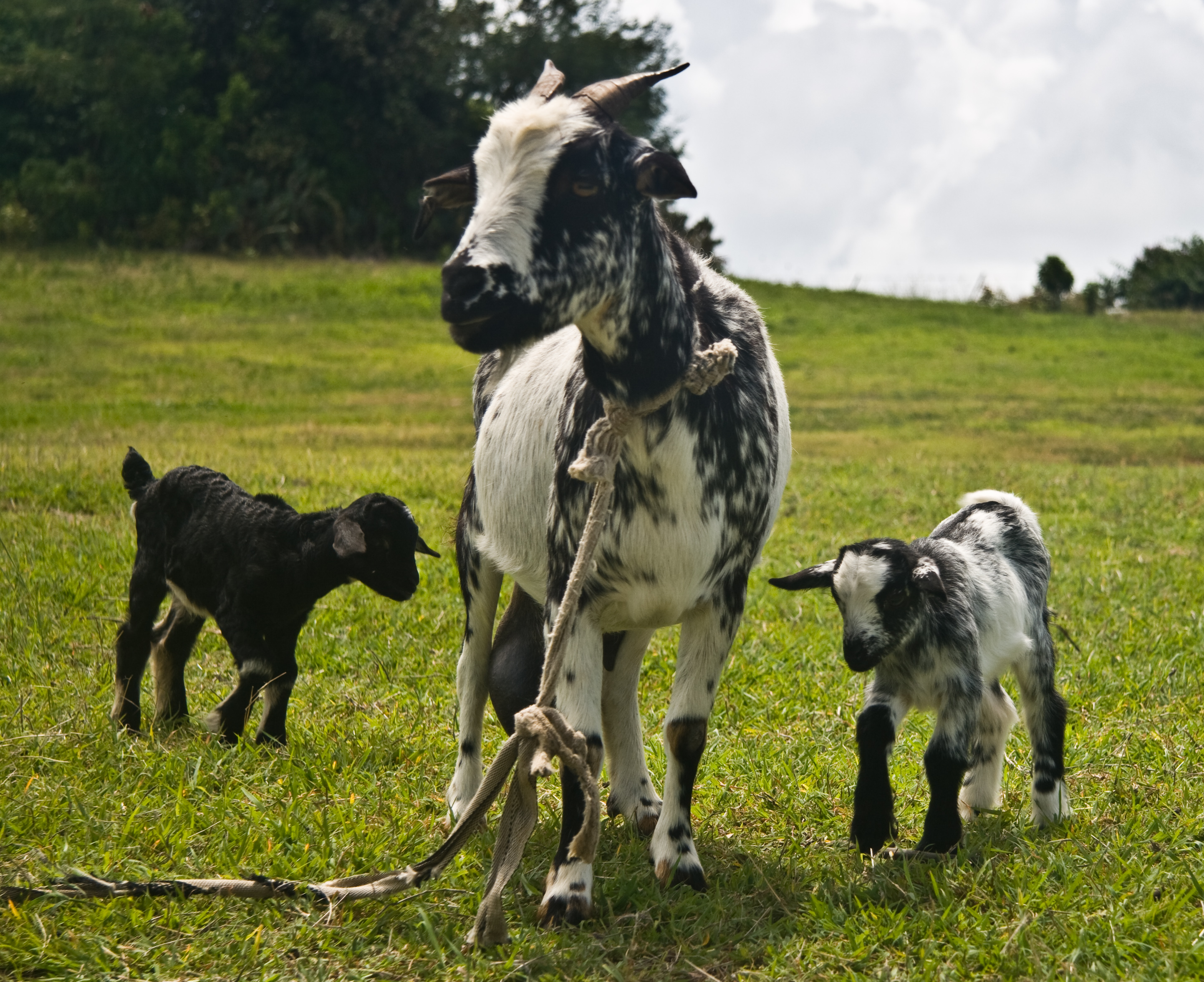
A female and two kids

=== Diet ===
Goats are reputed to be willing to eat almost anything. They are browsing animals, not grazers like cattle and sheep, and (coupled with their highly curious nature) will chew on and taste anything resembling plant matter to decide whether it is good to eat, including cardboard, clothing and paper.

The digestive physiology of a very young kid (like the young of other ruminants) is essentially the same as that of a monogastric animal. Milk digestion begins in the abomasum, the milk having bypassed the rumen via closure of the reticuloesophageal groove during suckling. At birth, the rumen is undeveloped, but as the kid begins to consume solid feed, the rumen soon increases in size and in its capacity to absorb nutrients.

The adult size of a particular goat is a product of its breed (genetic potential) and its diet while growing (nutritional potential). As with all livestock, increased protein diets (10 to 14%) and sufficient calories during the prepuberty period yield higher growth rates and larger eventual size than lower protein rates and limited calories. Large-framed goats, with a greater skeletal size, reach mature weight at a later age (36 to 42 months) than small-framed goats (18 to 24 months) if both are fed to their full potential. Large-framed goats need more calories than small-framed goats for maintenance of daily functions.

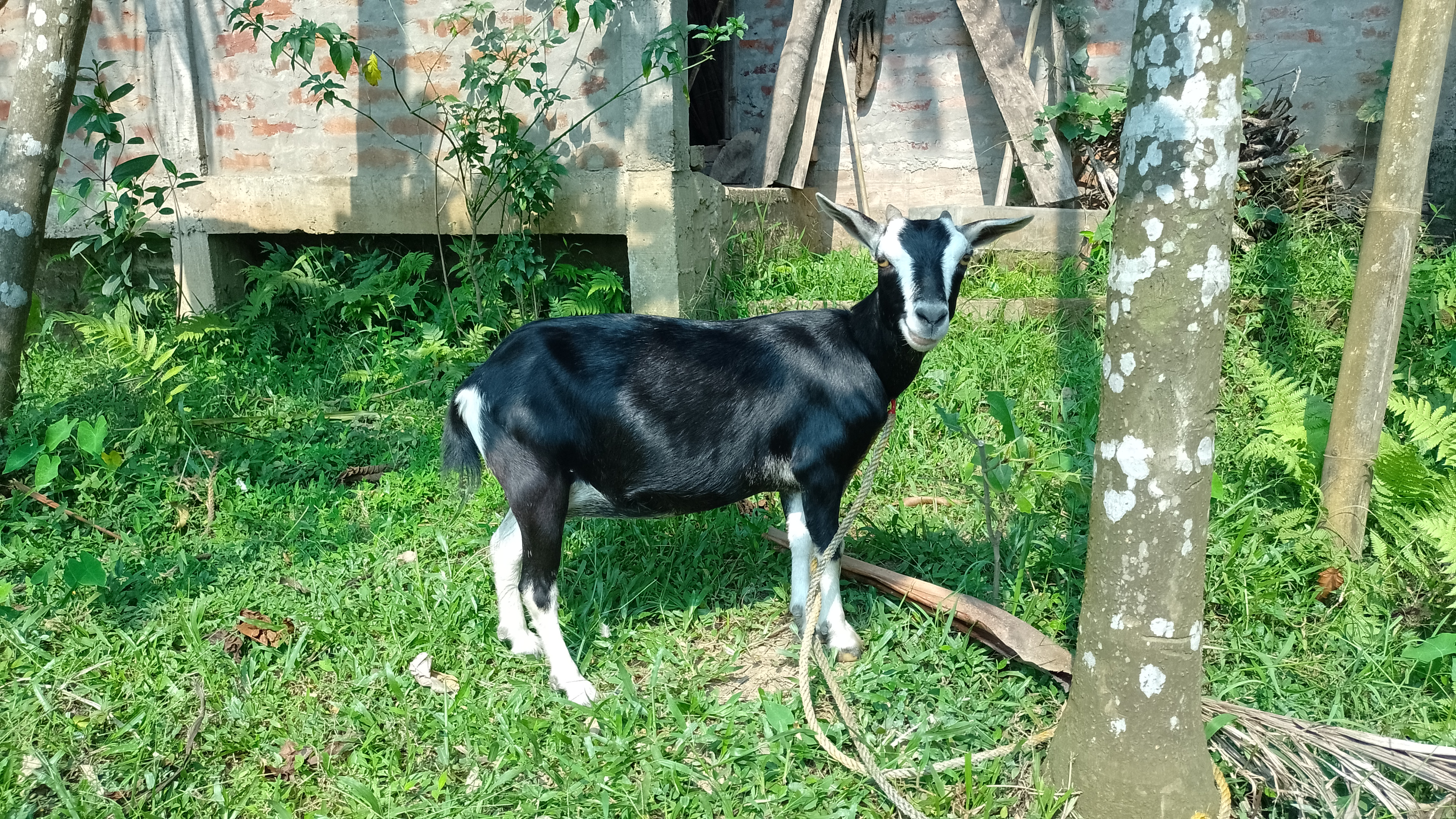
A goat tied to restrict its grazing area

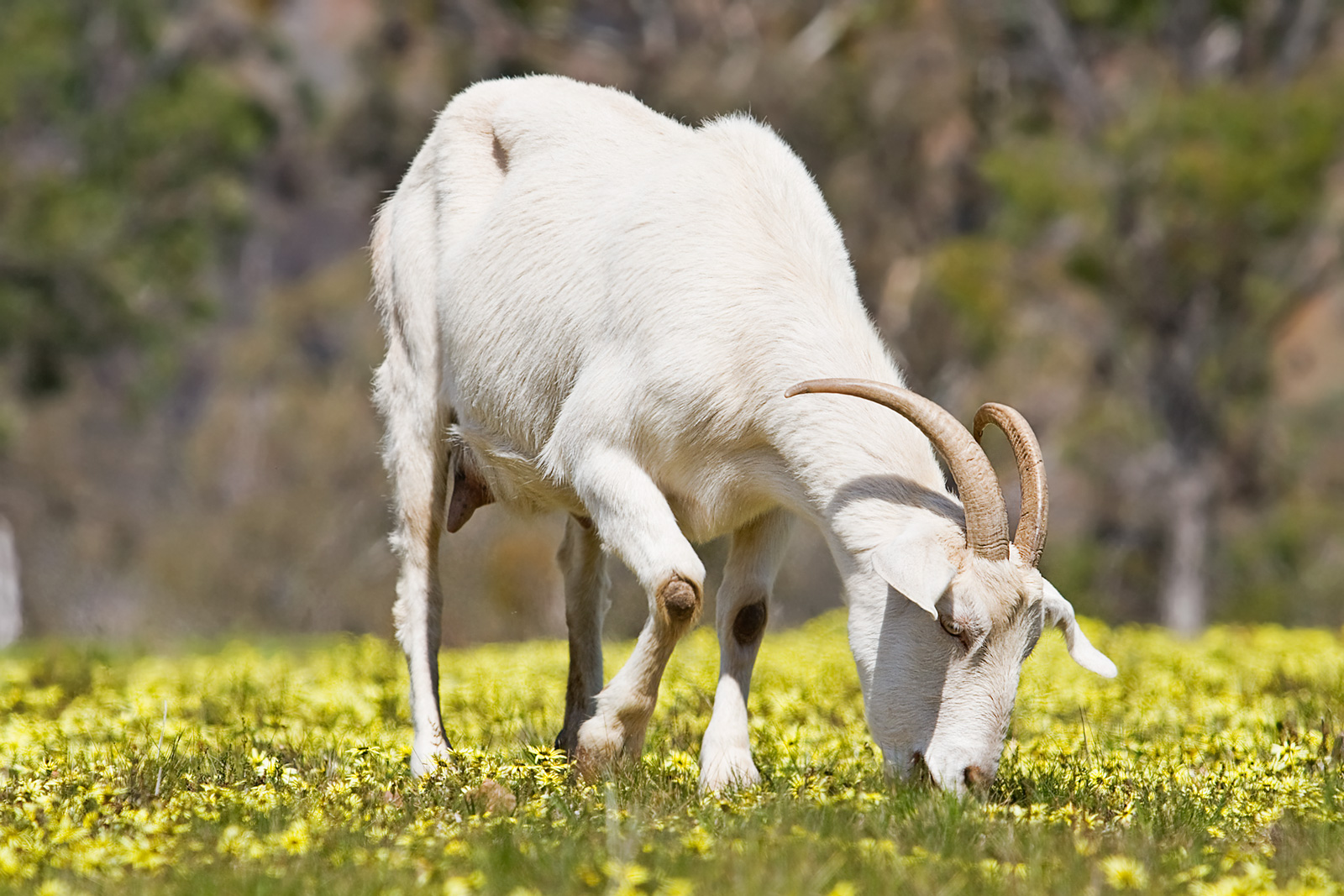
A goat feeding in a field of capeweed, toxic to most stock animals

=== Diseases and life expectancy ===
While goats are hardy animals and often need little medical care, they are subject to a number of diseases. Among the conditions affecting goats are respiratory diseases including pneumonia, foot rot, internal parasites, pregnancy toxicosis, and feed toxicity. Goats can become infected with various viral and bacterial diseases, such as foot-and-mouth disease, caprine arthritis encephalitis, caseous lymphadenitis, pinkeye, mastitis, and pseudorabies. They can transmit a number of zoonotic diseases to people, such as tuberculosis, brucellosis, Q fever, and rabies.

Life expectancy for goats is between 15 and 18 years. An instance of a goat reaching the age of 24 has been reported. Several factors can reduce this average expectancy; problems during kidding can lower a doe's expected life span to 10 or 11, and stresses of going into rut can lower a buck's expected life span to eight to 10 years.

== Agriculture ==
=== Husbandry ===
Husbandry, or animal care and use, varies by region and culture. The minimal requirements for goats include a grazing area or the bringing of fodder to penned animals, with enough hayracks for all of them to feed simultaneously; fresh water; salt licks; space for the animals to exercise; and disposal of soiled bedding.

In Africa and the Middle East, goats are typically run in flocks with sheep. This maximizes the production per acre, as goats and sheep prefer different food plants. Multiple types of goat-raising are found in Ethiopia, where four main types have been identified: pastured in annual crop systems, in perennial crop systems, with cattle, and in arid areas, under pastoral (nomadic) herding systems. In all four systems, however, goats were typically kept in extensive systems, with few purchased inputs.

In Nigeria and in parts of Latin America, some goats are allowed to wander the homestead or village, while others are kept penned and fed in a 'cut-and-carry' system. This involves cutting grasses, maize or cane for feed rather than allowing the animal access to the field. The system is well suited for crops like maize that are sensitive to trampling.

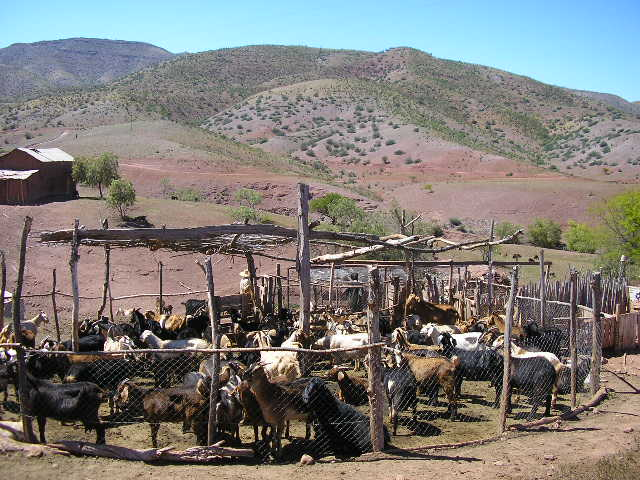
Goat husbandry in Chile

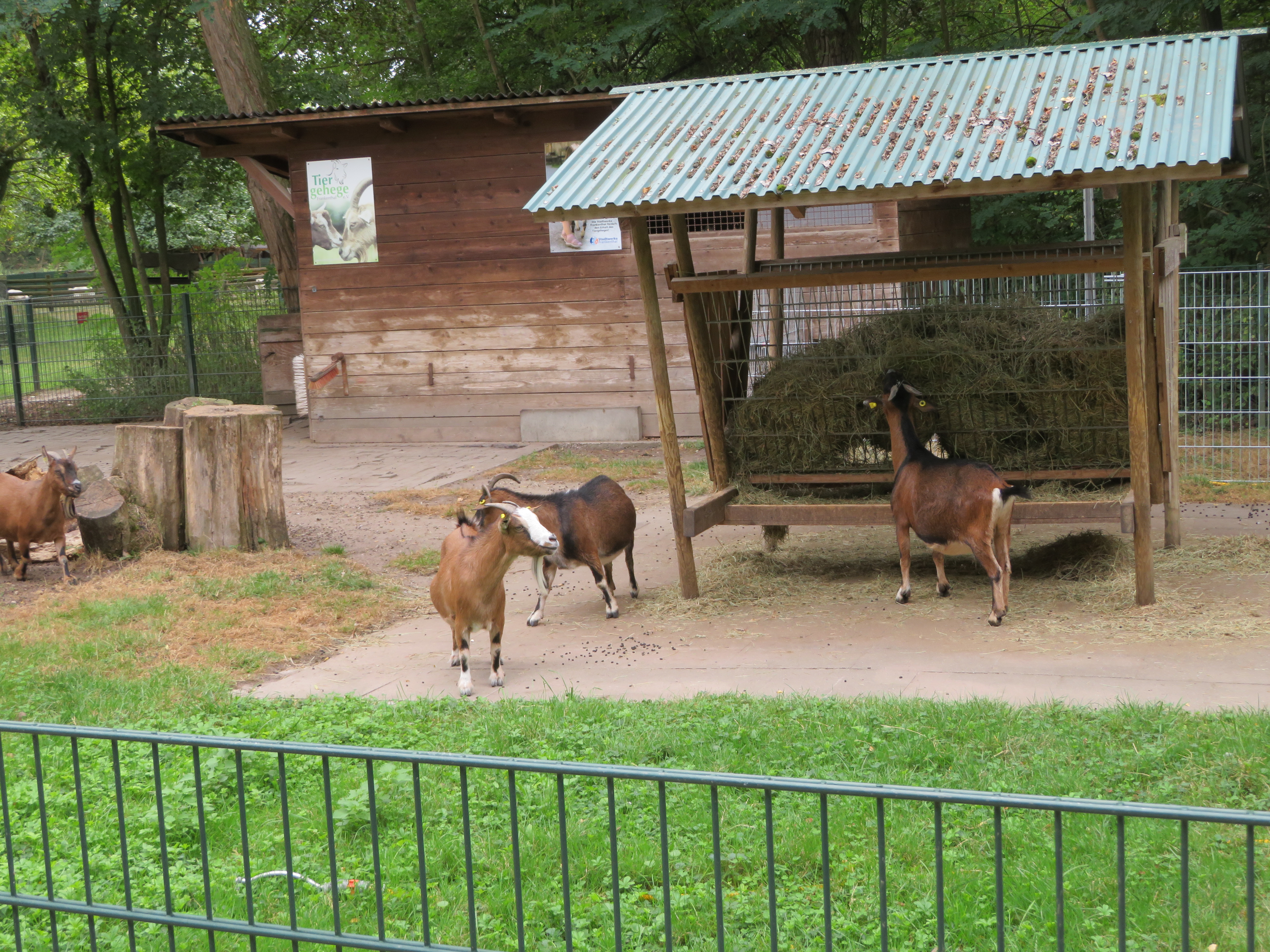
Small-scale goat husbandry in Germany

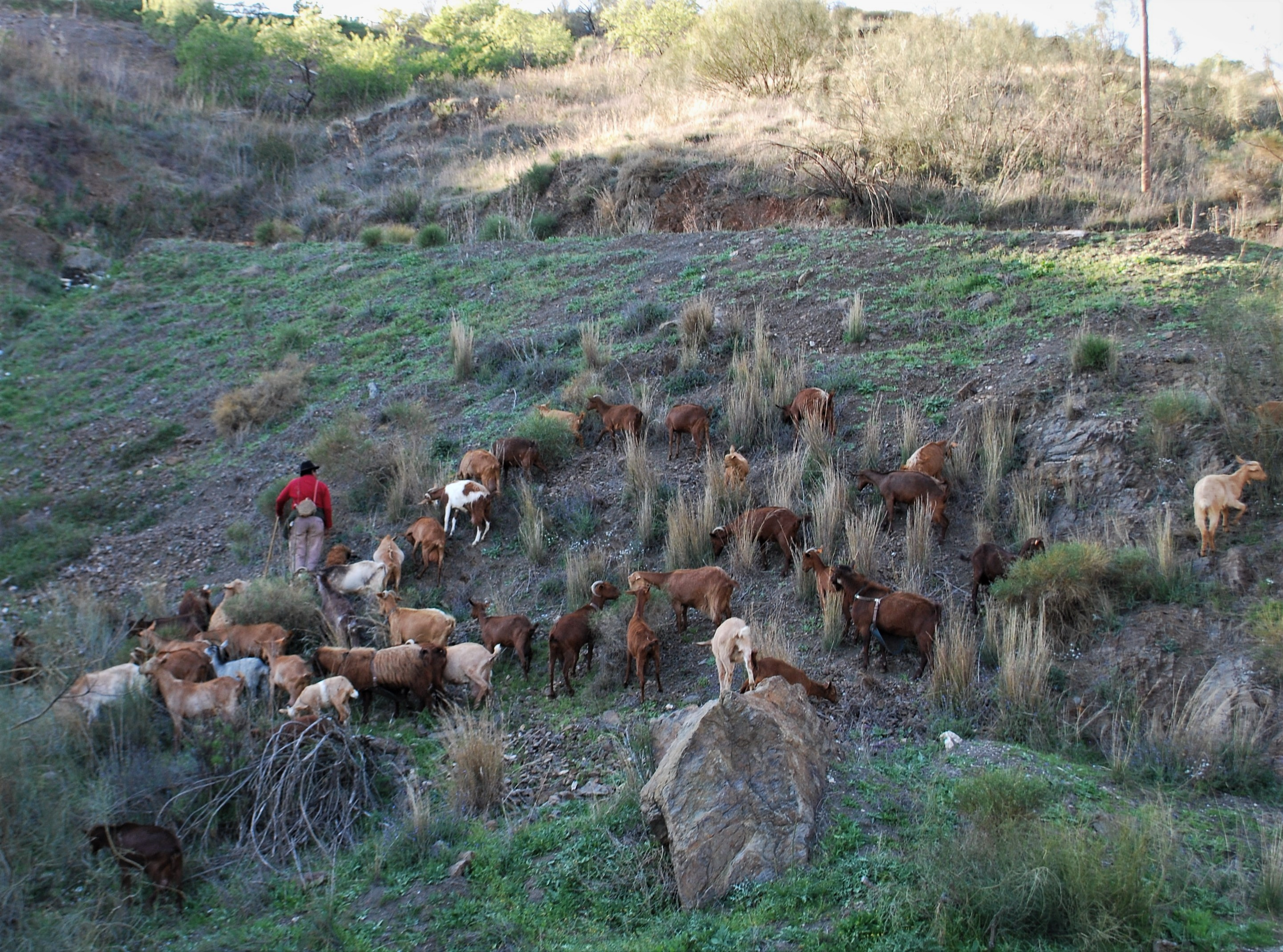
A goatherd leading his goats on a rough hillside in Spain

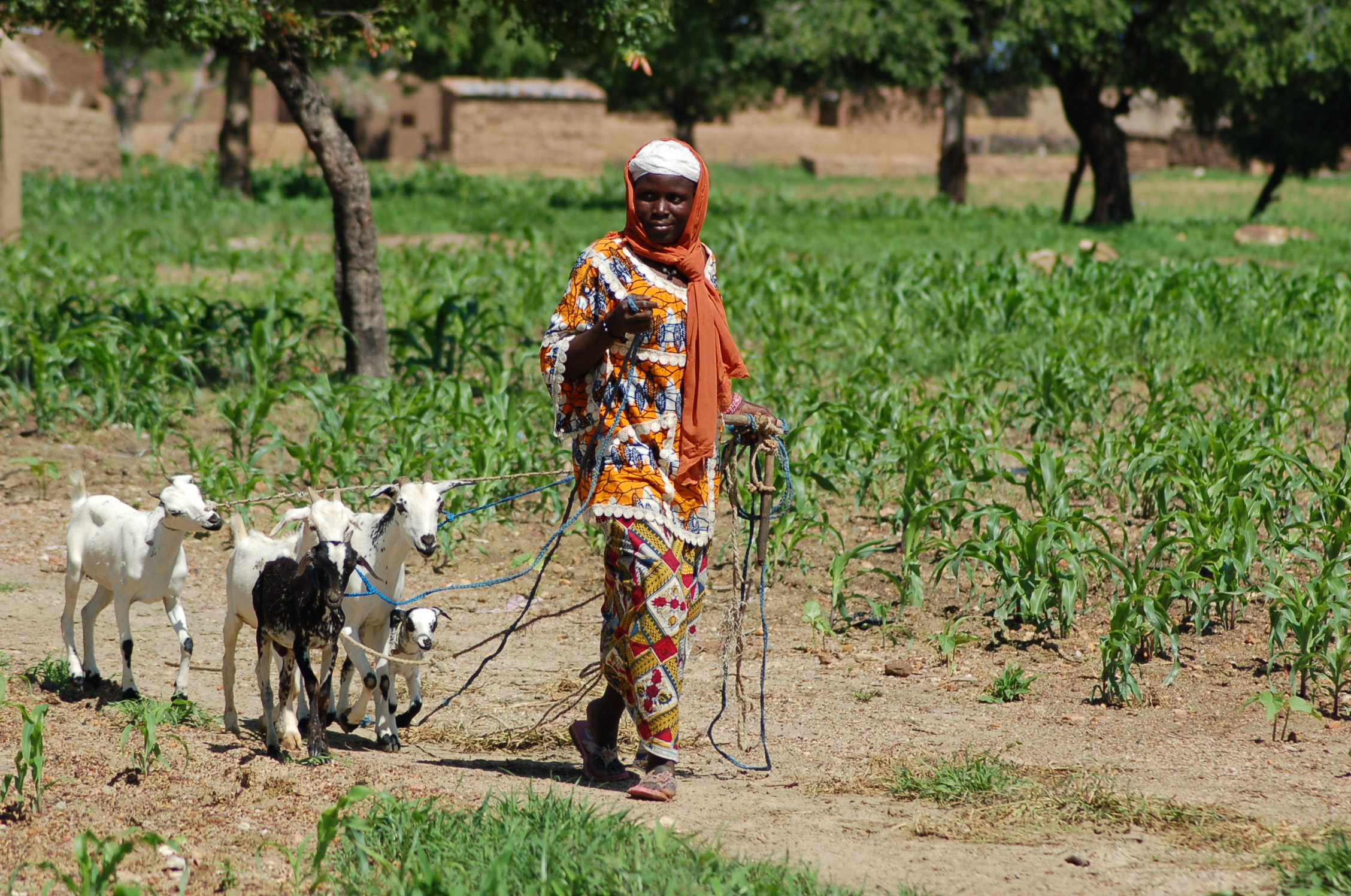
A smallholder with goats in Burkina Faso

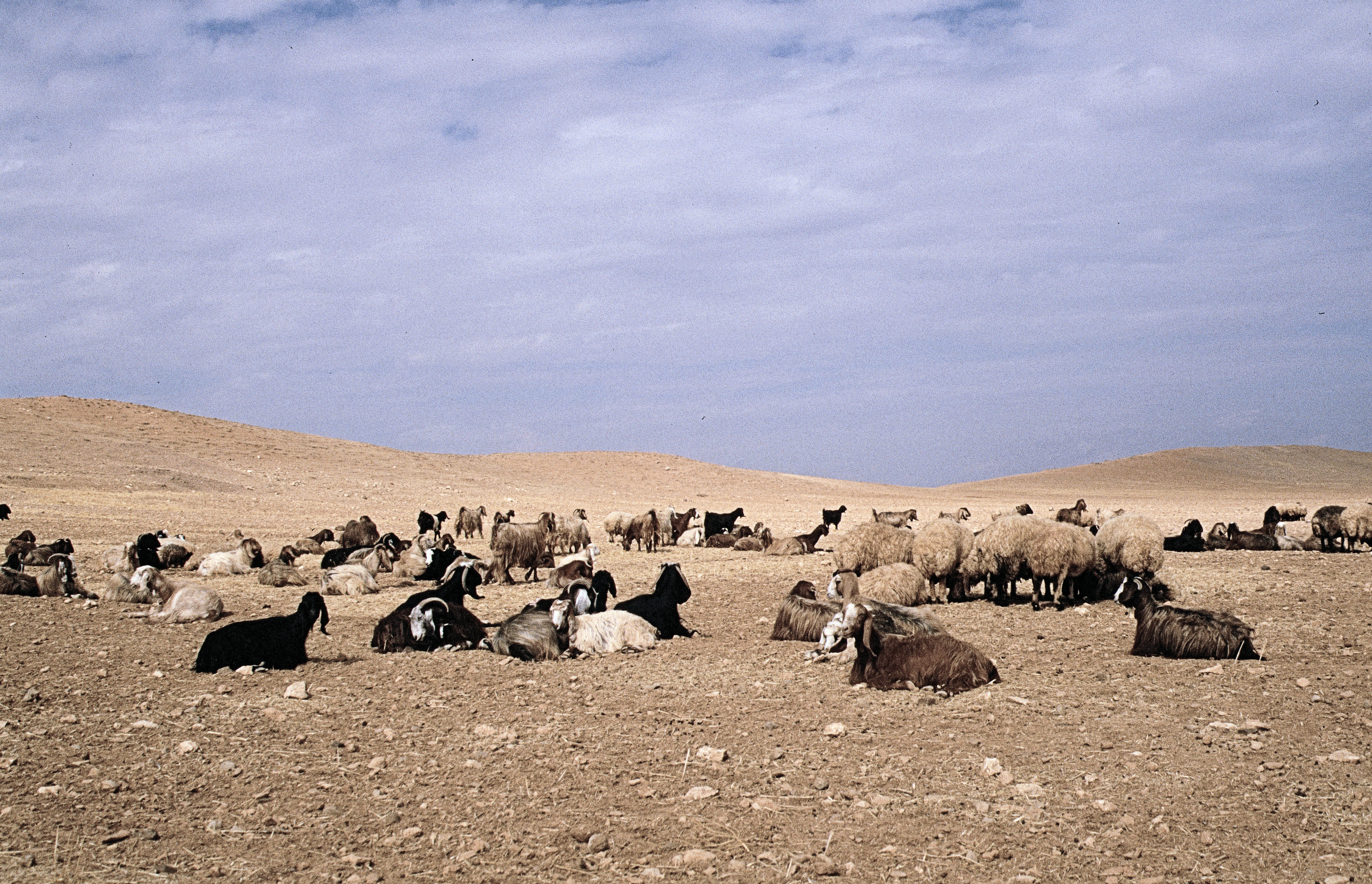
Mixed herd of goats and sheep for efficient grazing, Syria

=== Population ===
There were more than 1.18 billion goats globally in 2024, with the most populous countries being India (211 million), China (118 million) and Nigeria (91 million). Almost 564 million goats are slaughtered for meat per year, yielding 7.74 million tons of meat.

The top producers of goat milk in 2022 were India (6.25 million metric tons), Bangladesh (0.91 million metric tons), and South Sudan (0.52 million metric tons). As of 2015, India slaughters 41% of 124.4 million goats each year. The 0.6 million metric tonnes of goat meat make up 8% of India's annual meat production.

Live goats

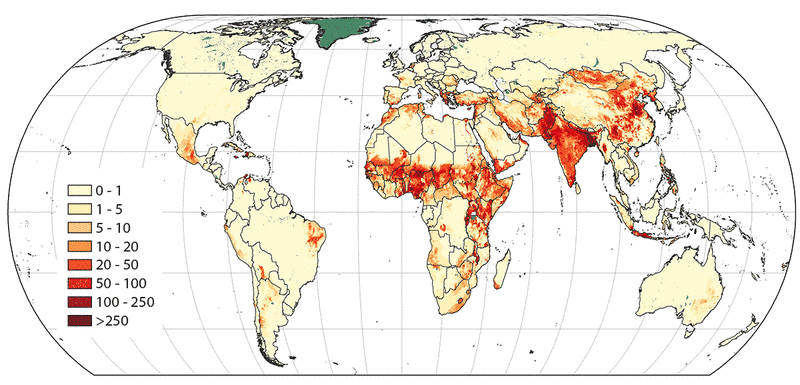
Worldwide distribution of goats in 2015. The colour key shows the number of goats per square kilometre.

=== Feral goats ===
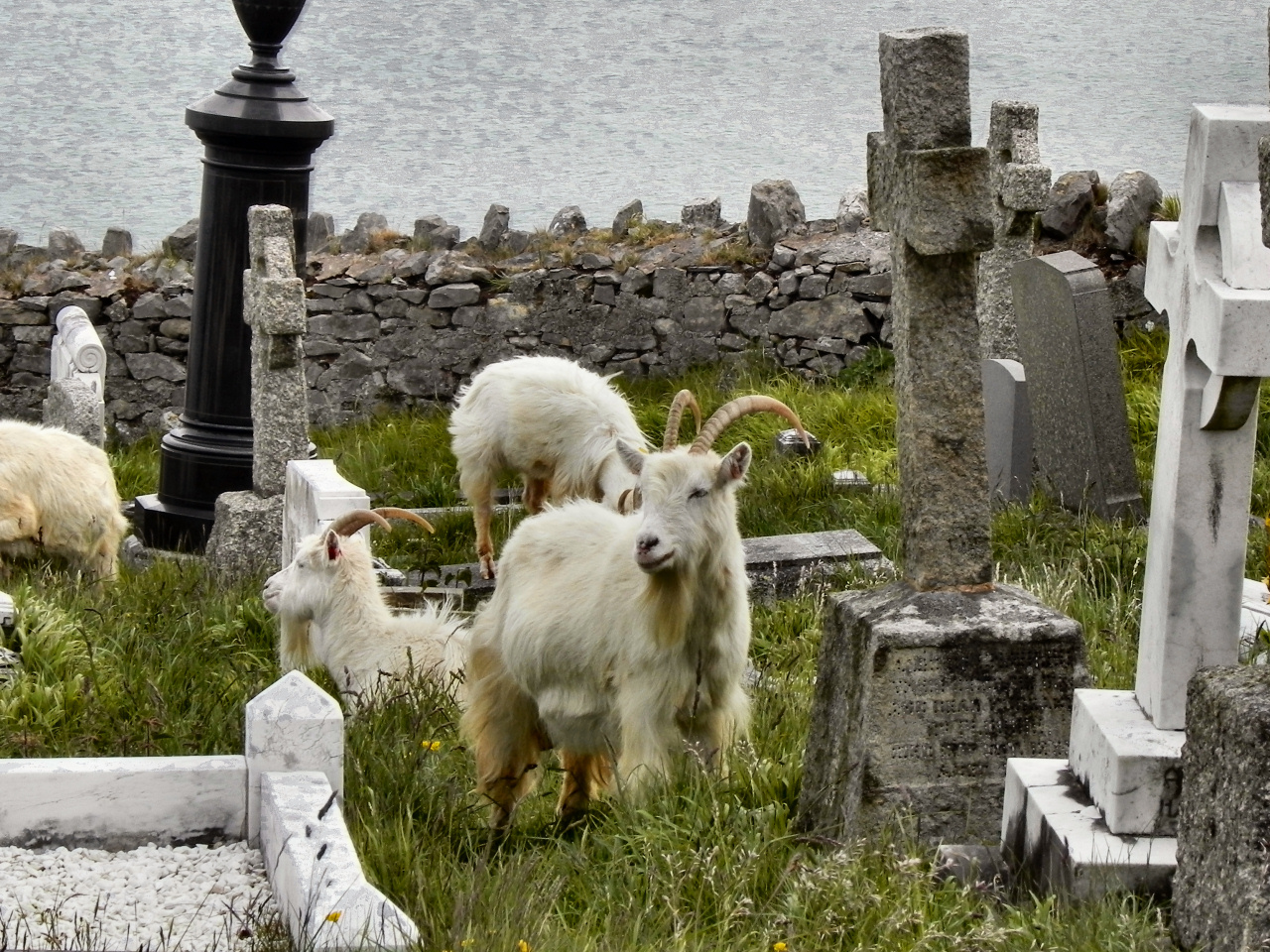
Feral goats in a churchyard near Llandudno, Wales

Goats readily revert to the wild (become feral) if given the opportunity. Feral goats have established themselves in many areas: they occur in Australia, New Zealand, Great Britain, the Galapagos and many other places. When feral goats reach large populations in habitats that provide unlimited water supply and do not contain sufficient large predators or are otherwise vulnerable to goats' aggressive grazing habits, they may have serious effects, such as removing native scrub and trees. Feral goats are extremely common in Australia, with an estimated 2.6 million in the mid-1990s.

== Uses ==
Goats are used to provide milk and specialty wools, and as meat and goatskin. Some charities provide goats to impoverished people in poor countries, in the belief that having useful things alleviates poverty better than cash. The cost of obtaining goats and then distributing them can however be high.

=== Meat ===
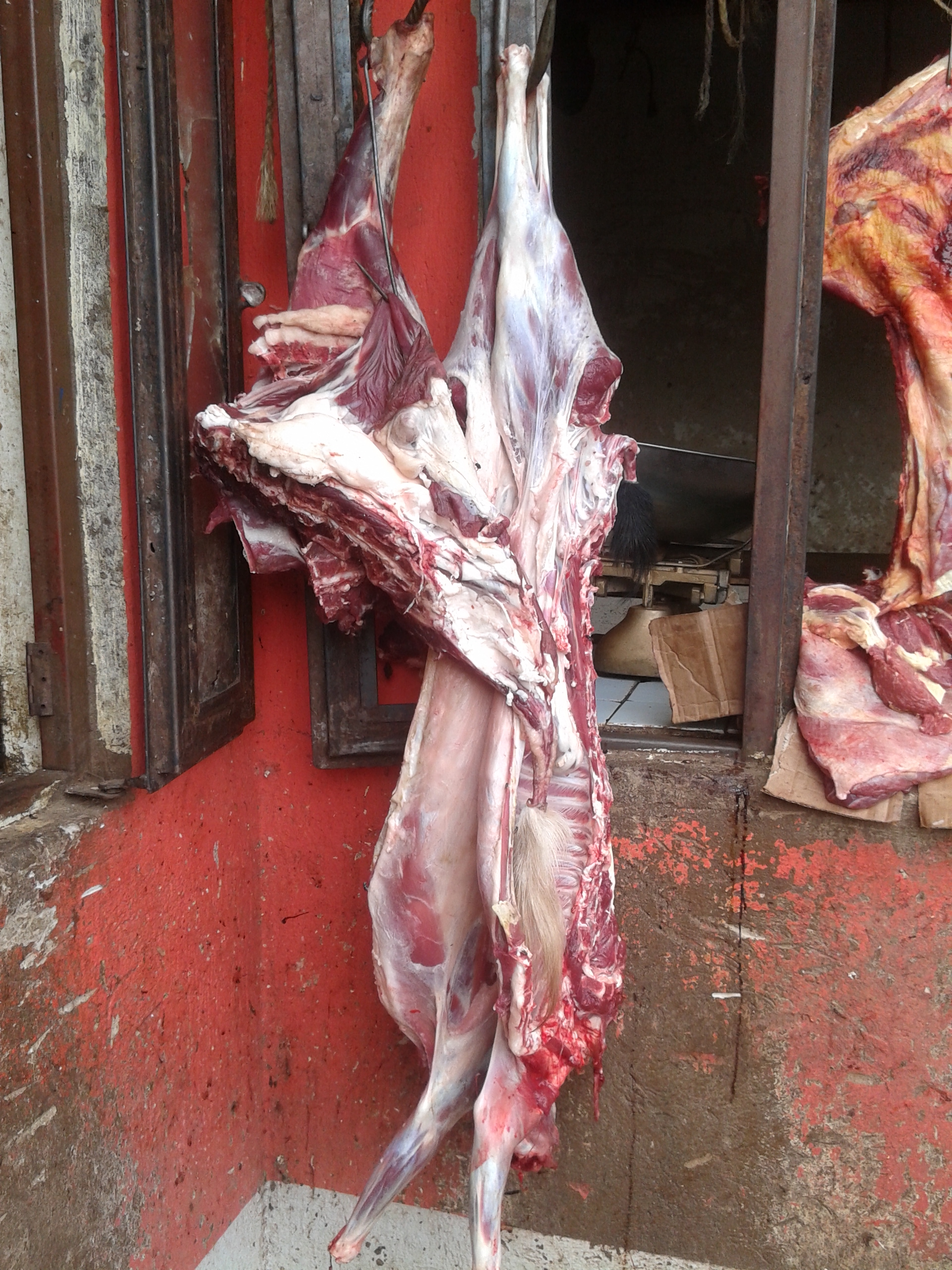
Goat meat sold at a market in Nigeria

The taste of goat kid meat is similar to that of spring lamb meat; in the English-speaking islands of the Caribbean, and in South Asia, the word 'mutton' denotes the meat of both goat and sheep. Some compare the taste of goat meat to veal or venison, depending on the age and condition of the goat. Its taste is primarily given by the presence of 4-methyloctanoic and 4-methylnonanoic acids. The meat is made into dishes such as goat curry, mutton satay, and capra e fagioli.

=== Milk, butter, and cheese ===
Goats produce about 2% of the world's total annual milk supply. Dairy goats produce an average of 540 to 1,180 kg (1,200 to 2,600 lb) of milk during an average 284-day lactation. The milk can contain between around 3.5% and 5% butterfat according to breed. Goat milk is processed into products including cheese and Dulce de leche.

=== Mohair and cashmere wool ===
Most goats have soft insulating hairs nearer the skin, and long guard hairs on the surface. The soft hairs are the ones valued by the textile industry; the material goes by names such as down, cashmere and pashmina. The coarse guard hairs are of little value as they are too coarse and difficult to spin and dye. The cashmere goat produces a commercial quantity of fine and soft cashmere wool, one of the most expensive natural fibers commercially produced. It is harvested once a year. The Angora breed of goats produces long, curling, lustrous locks of mohair. The entire body of the goat is covered with mohair and there are no guard hairs. The locks constantly grow to four inches or more in length. Angora crossbreeds, such as the pygora and the nigora, have been created to produce mohair and/or cashgora on a smaller, easier-to-manage animal. The wool is shorn twice a year, with an average yield of about 4.5 kg (10 lb).

=== Land clearing ===
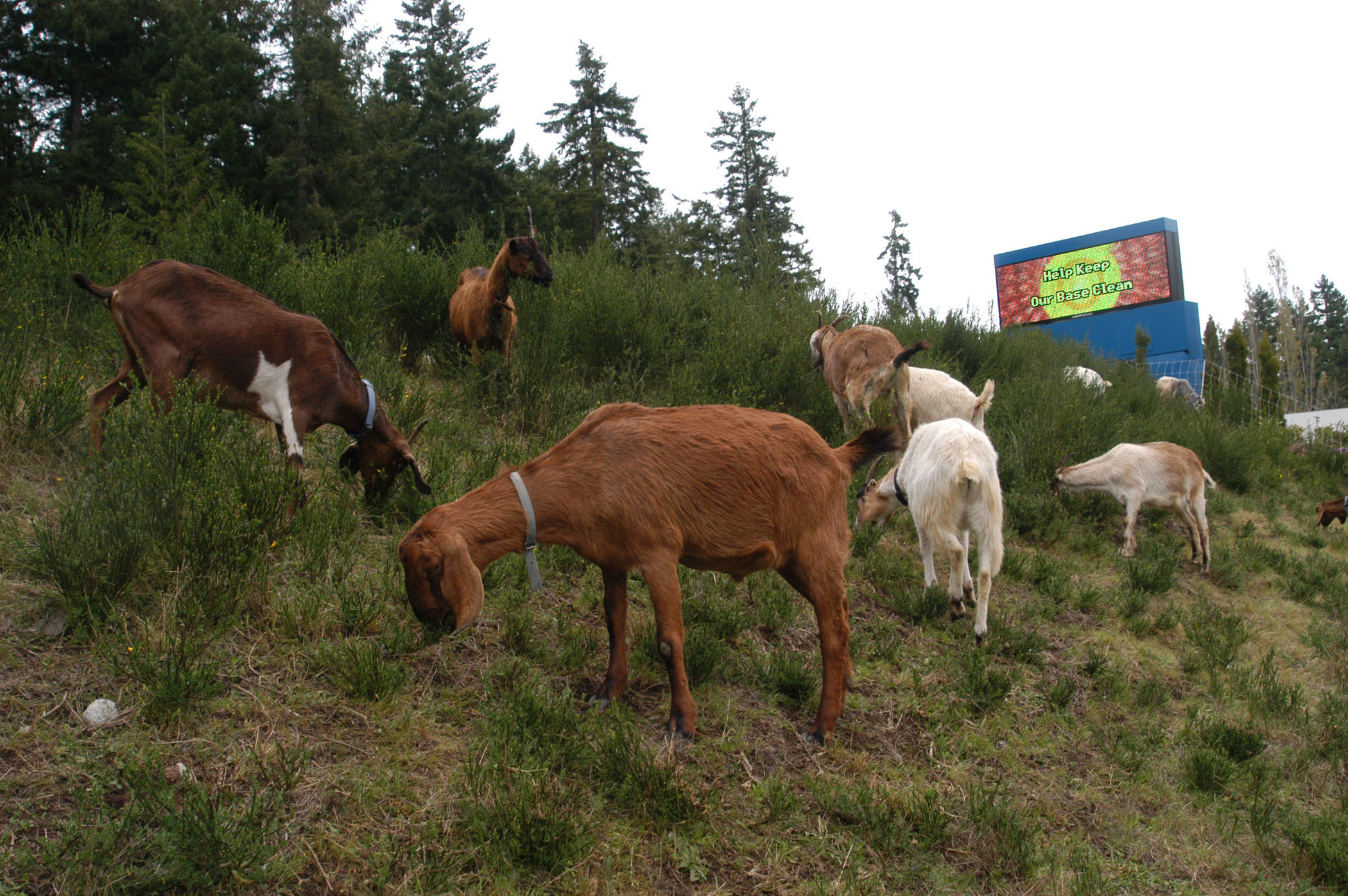
Goats being used as an environmentally friendly method to clear invasive weeds during Earth Day 2010.

Goats have been used by humans to clear unwanted vegetation for centuries. They have been described as "eating machines" and "biological control agents". There has been a resurgence of this in North America since 1990, when herds were used to clear dry brush from California hillsides thought to be endangered by potential wildfires. This form of using goats to clear land is sometimes known as conservation grazing. Since then, numerous public and private agencies have hired private herds from companies such as Rent A Goat to perform similar tasks. This may be expensive and their smell may be a nuisance. This practice has become popular in the Pacific Northwest, where they are used to remove invasive species not easily removed by humans, including (thorned) blackberry vines and poison oak. Chattanooga, TN and Spartanburg, SC have used goats to control kudzu, an invasive plant species prevalent in the southeastern United States.

=== Medical training ===
Some countries' militaries use goats to train combat medics. In the United States, goats have become the main animal species used for this purpose after the Pentagon phased out using dogs for medical training in the 1980s. While modern mannequins used in medical training are quite efficient in simulating the behavior of a human body, trainees feel that "the goat exercise provide[s] a sense of urgency that only real life trauma can provide". The practice has elicited outcry from animal-rights groups.

=== Pets ===
Some people choose goats as a pet because of their ability to form close bonds with their human guardians. Goats are social animals and usually prefer the company of other goats, but because of their herd mentality, they will follow their owner and form close bonds with them, hence their continuing popularity.

Goats are similar to deer with regard to nutrition and need a wide range of food, including things like hay, grain feed or pelleted grain mix, and loose minerals. Goats generally either inherit certain feeding preferences or learn them after birth.

Uses of goats

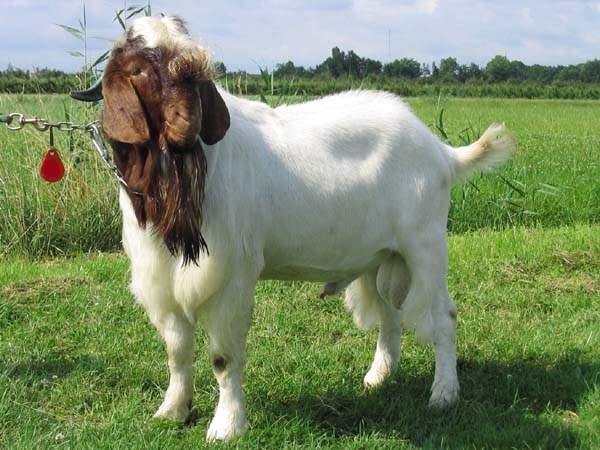
The Boer goat, a meat breed

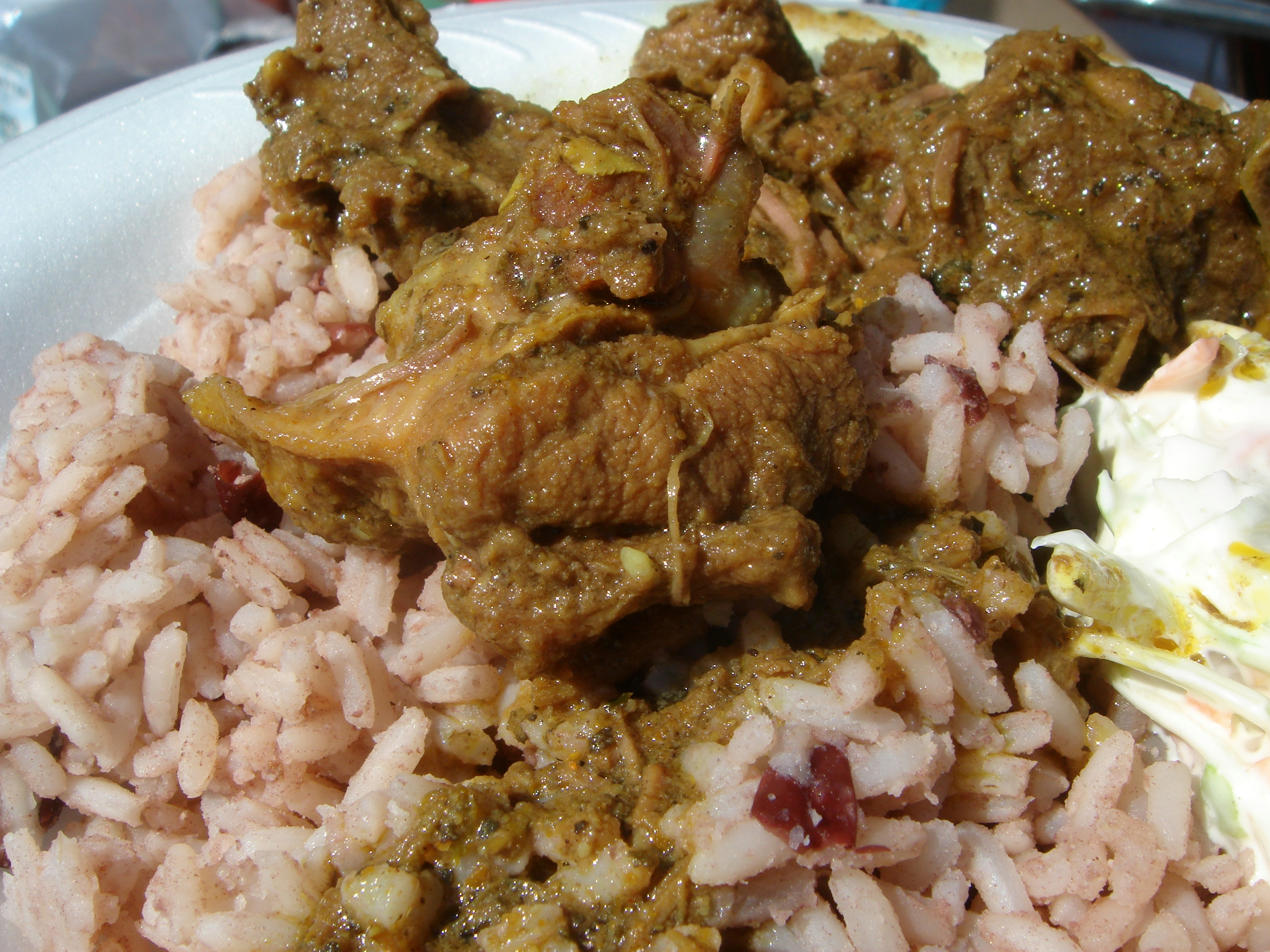
Goat curry and rice at the Notting Hill Carnival

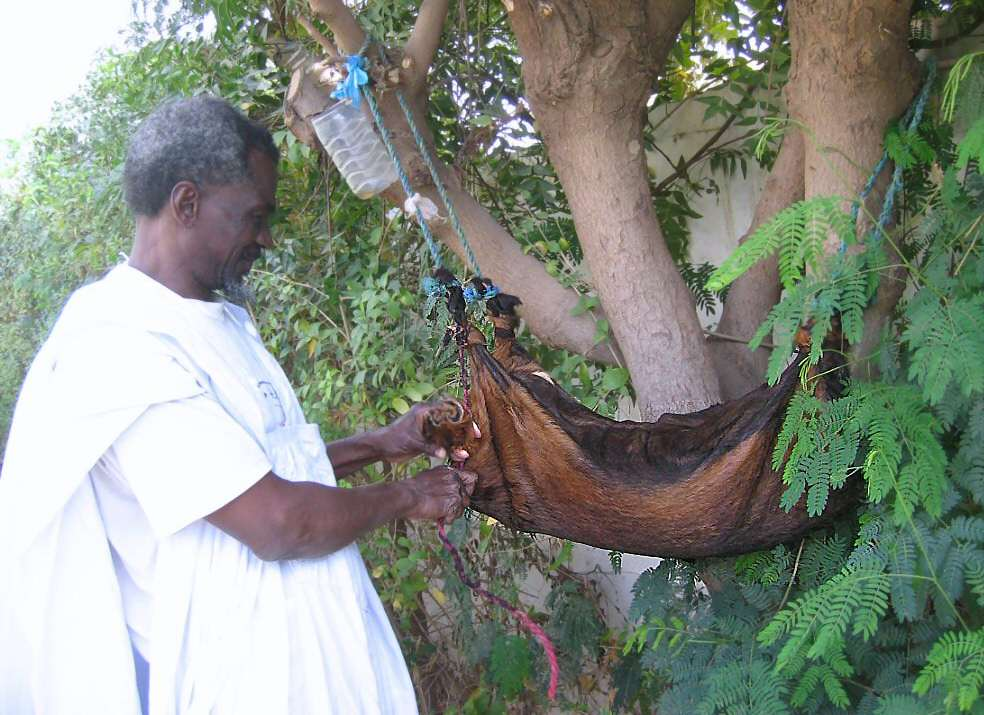
Goatskin water container in Mauritania

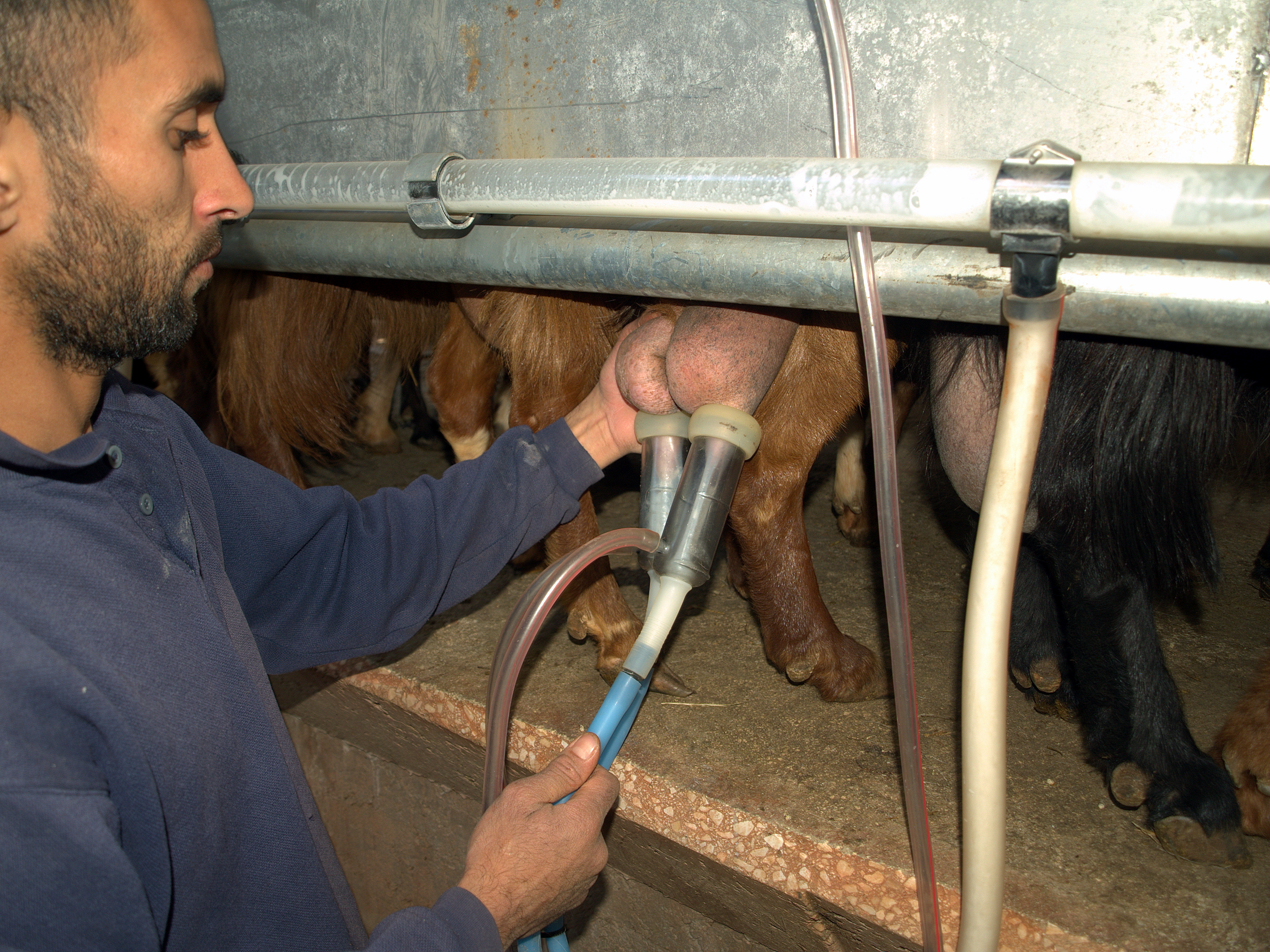
A goat being milked by machine

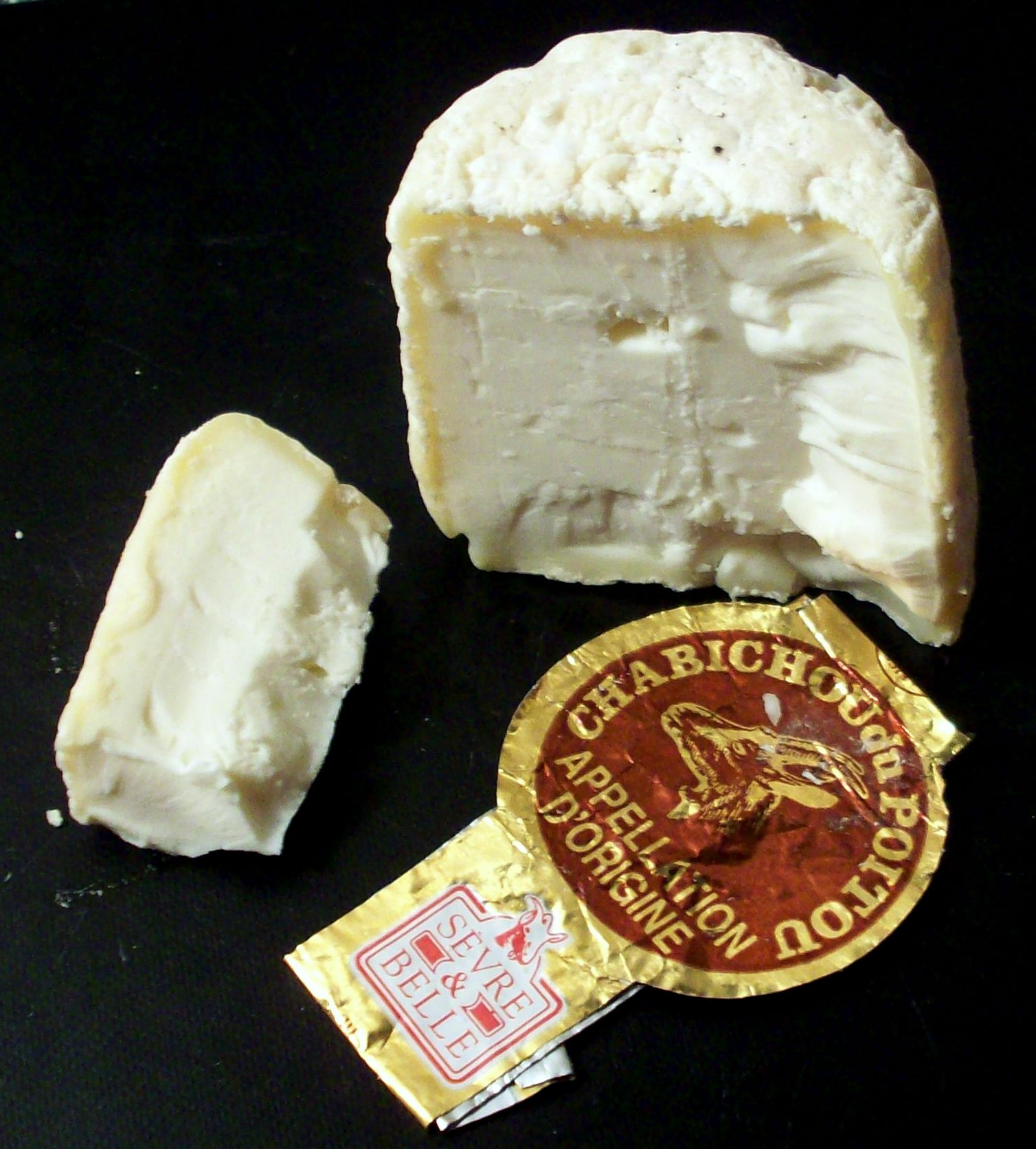
Chabichou, a French goat cheese

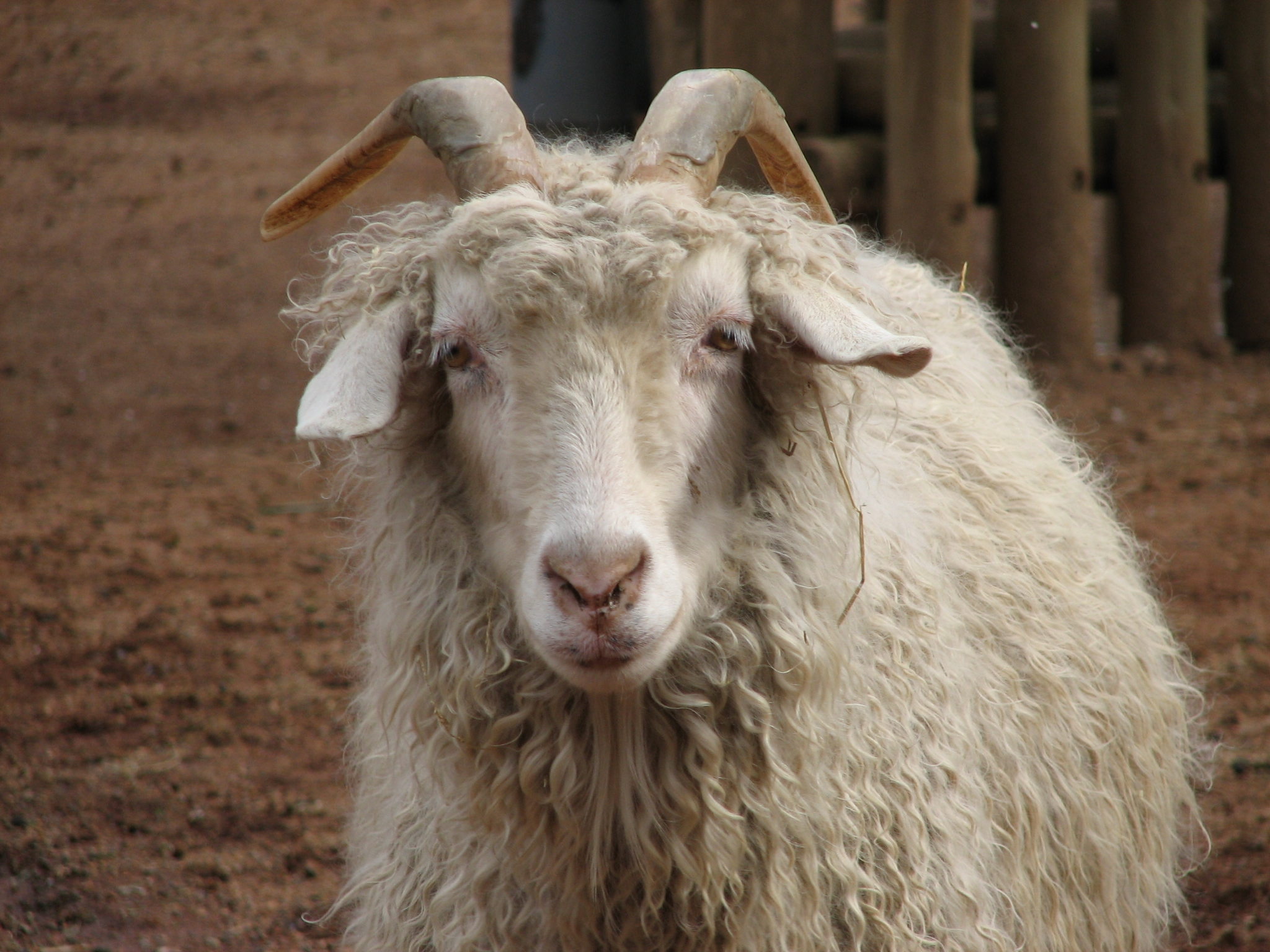
Angora goat with long coat of mohair

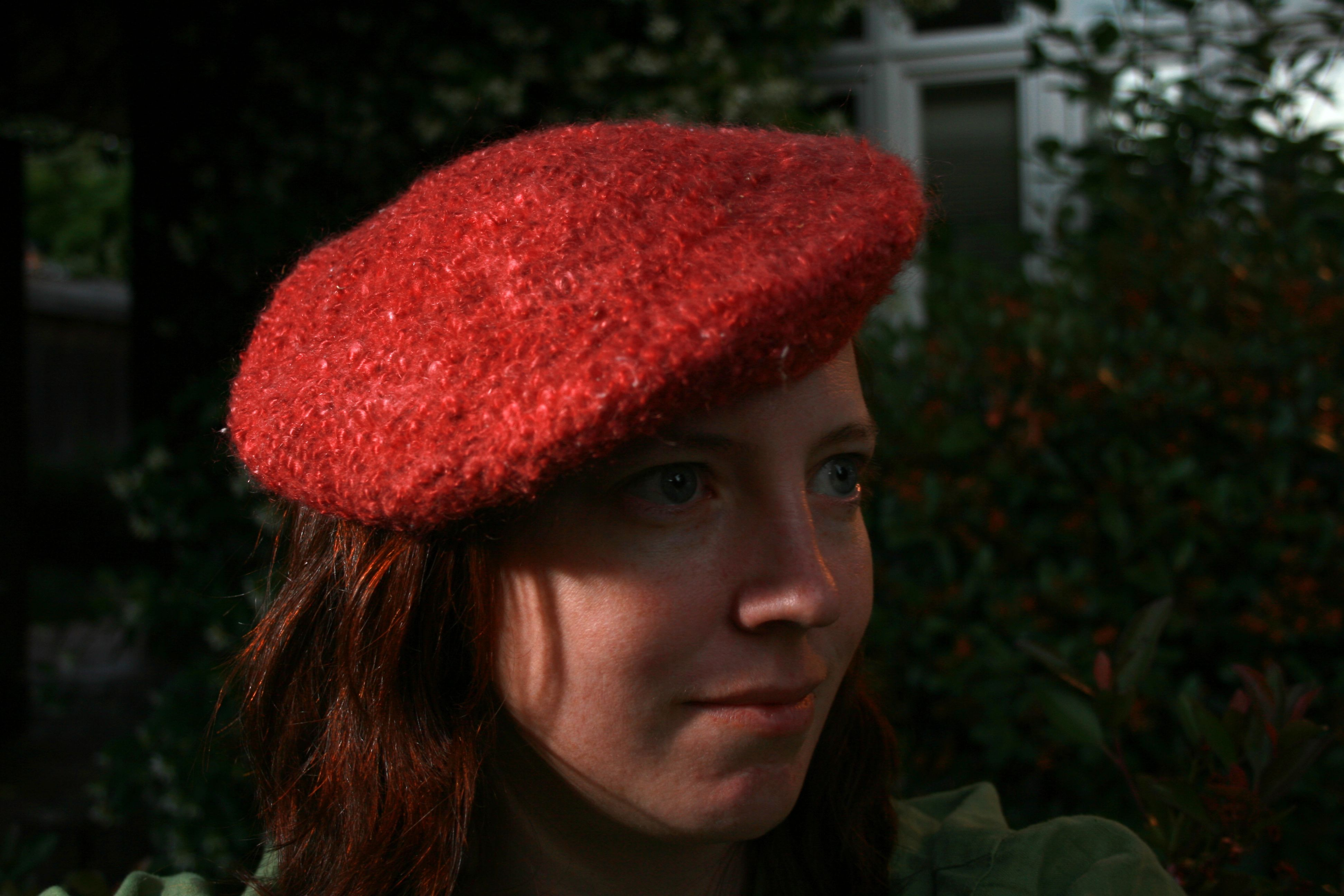
A mohair wool beret

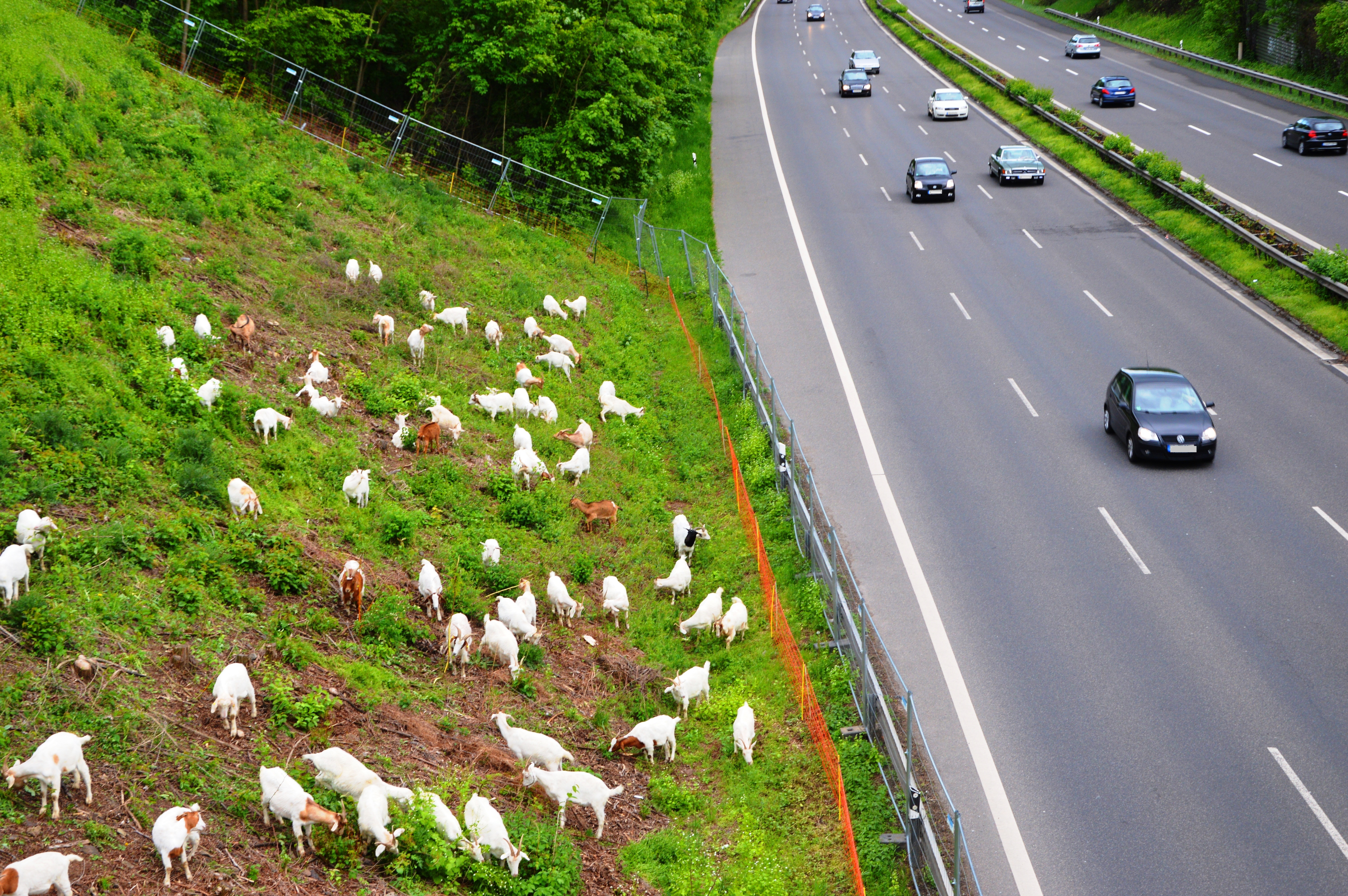
Goats managing a German motorway embankment

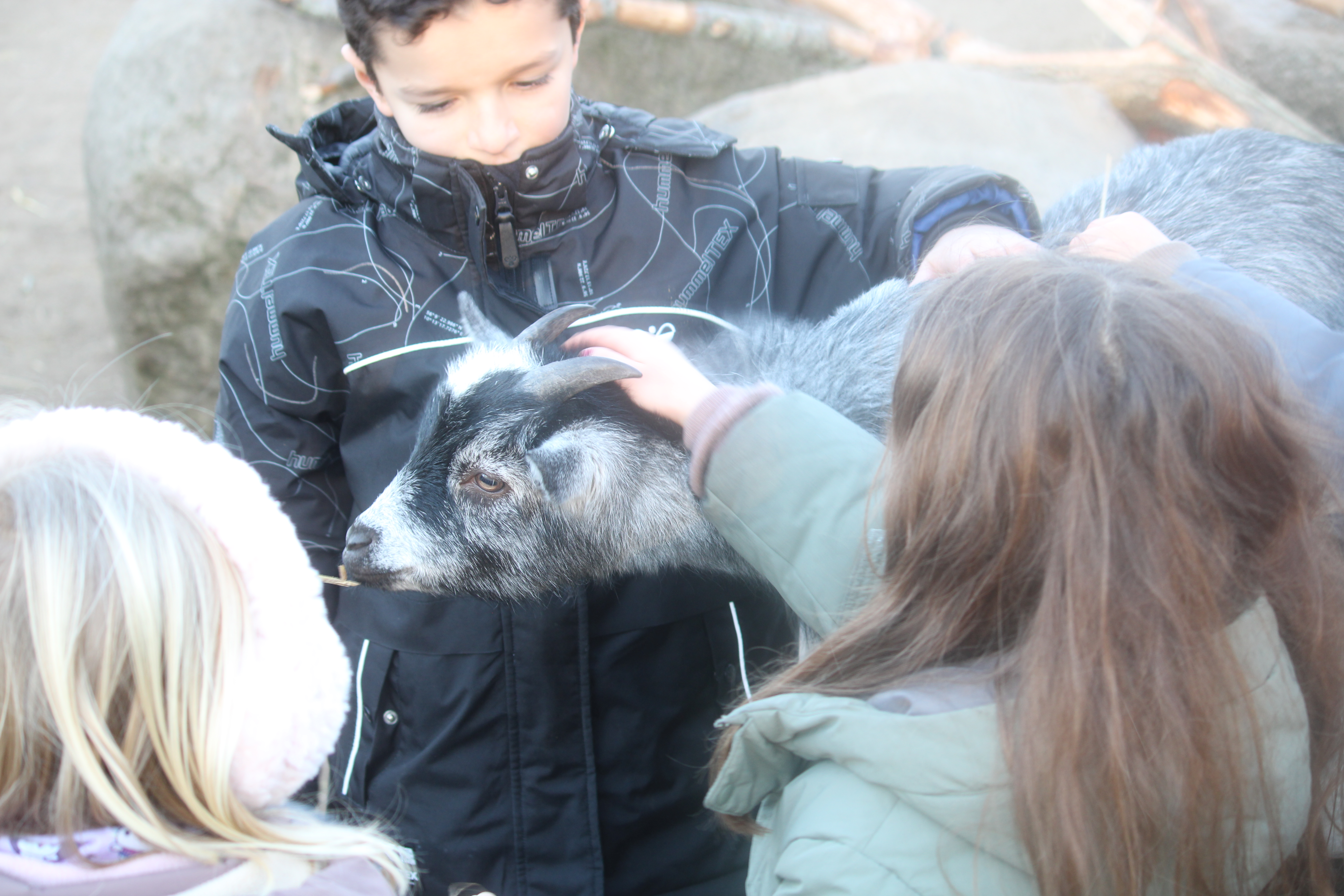
Goat being petted at Copenhagen Zoo's children's zoo

== In culture ==
In classical myth, Amalthea is either a nymph who fed the infant god Jupiter with goat's milk, or the goat who suckled the infant. In another legend, the god broke one of the goat's horns, endowing it with the power to fill itself with whatever its owner wanted, making it the cornucopia or horn of plenty. The ancient city of Ebla in Syria contains a tomb with a throne decorated with bronze goat heads, now called "The Tomb of the Lord of the Goats".

In Norse mythology, the god of thunder, Thor, has a chariot that is pulled by the goats Tanngrisnir and Tanngnjóstr At night when he sets up camp, Thor eats the meat of the goats, but takes care that all bones remain whole. Then he wraps the remains up, and in the morning, the goats always come back to life to pull the chariot. When a farmer's son who is invited to share the meal breaks one of the goats' leg bones to suck the marrow, the animal's leg remains broken in the morning, and the boy is forced to serve Thor as a servant to compensate for the damage. Possibly related, the Yule goat (Julbocken) is a Scandinavian Christmas tradition. It originally denoted the goat that was slaughtered around Yule, now more often a goat figure made out of straw. It is used for the custom of going door-to-door singing carols and getting food and drinks in return, often fruit, cakes and sweets. The Gävle goat is a giant version of the yule goat, erected every year in the Swedish city of Gävle. In Finland the tradition of Nuutinpäivä—St. Knut's Day, January 13—involves young men dressed as goats (Finnish: Nuuttipukki) who visit houses. Usually the dress was an inverted fur jacket, a leather or birch bark mask, and horns. Unlike the analogous Santa Claus, Nuuttipukki was a scary character (cf. Krampus). The men dressed as Nuuttipukki wandered from house to house, came in, and typically demanded food from the household and especially leftover alcohol. In Finland the Nuuttipukki tradition is kept alive in areas of Satakunta, Southwest Finland and Ostrobothnia. Nowadays the character is usually played by children and involves a happy encounter.

The goat is one of the 12-year cycle of animals which appear in the Chinese zodiac. Several mythological hybrid creatures contain goat parts, including the Chimera. The Capricorn constellation sign in the Western zodiac is usually depicted as a goat with a fish's tail. Fauns and satyrs are mythological creatures with human bodies and goats' legs. The lustful Greek god Pan similarly has the upper body of a man and the horns and lower body of a goat.

In Hinduism, Daksha, one of the prajapati, is sometimes depicted with the head of a male goat. A legend states that Daksha failed to invite Shiva to a sacrifice; Shiva beheaded Daksha, but when asked by Vishnu, restored Daksha to life with the head of a goat. Goats are mentioned many times in the Bible. Their importance in ancient Israel is indicated by the seven different Hebrew and three Greek terms used in the Bible. A goat is considered a "clean" animal by Jewish dietary laws and a kid was slaughtered for an honored guest. It was also acceptable for some kinds of sacrifices. Goat-hair curtains were used in the tent that contained the tabernacle (Exodus 25:4). Its horns can be used instead of sheep's horn to make a shofar. On Yom Kippur, the festival of the Day of Atonement, two goats were chosen and lots were drawn for them. One was sacrificed and the other allowed to escape into the wilderness, symbolically carrying with it the sins of the community. From this comes the word "scapegoat". The devil is sometimes depicted, like Baphomet, as a goat, making the animal a significant symbol throughout Satanism. The inverted pentagram of Satanism is sometimes depicted with a goat's head of Baphomet, which originated from the Church of Satan.

Goats in art and culture

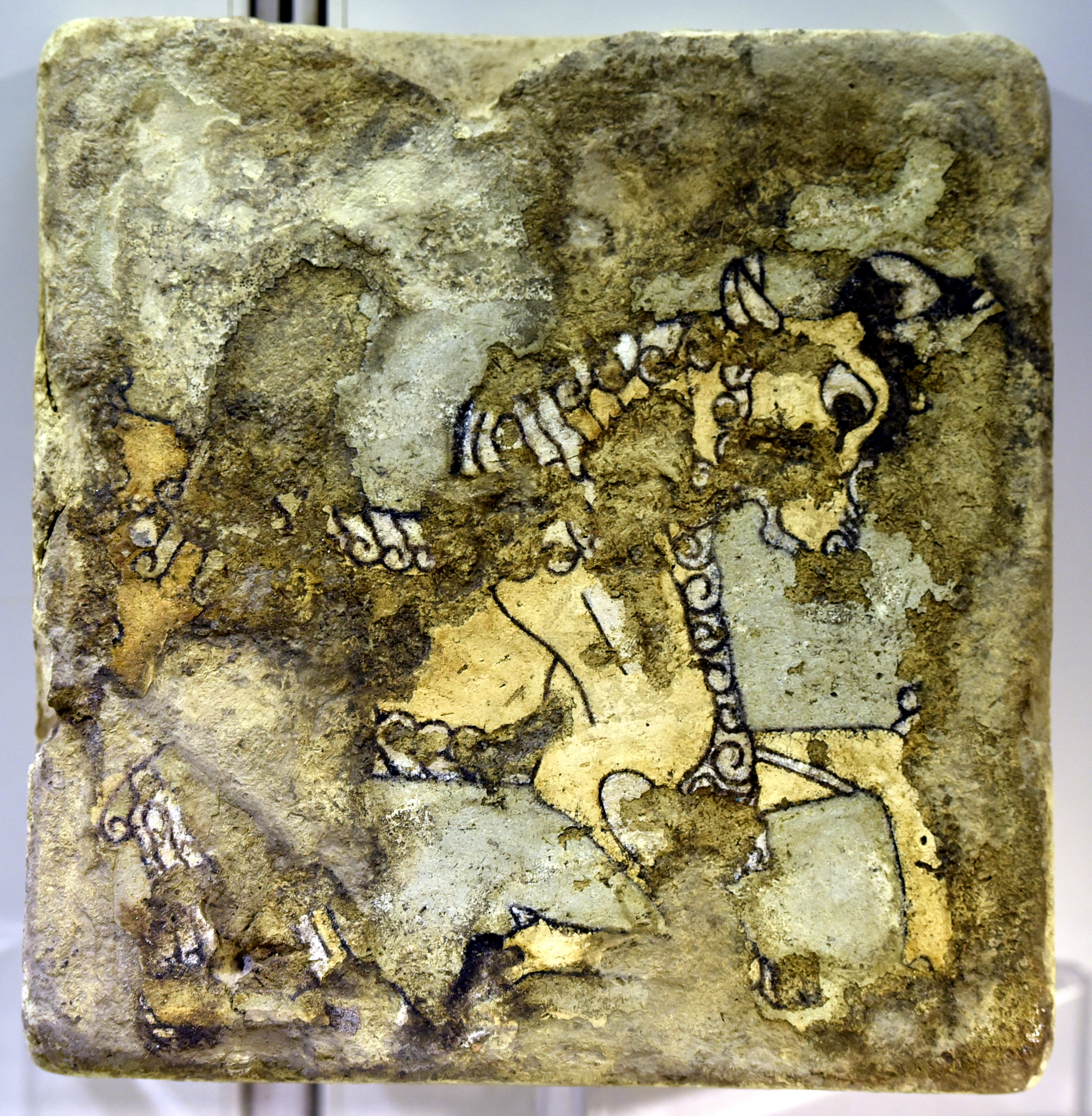
Glazed brick depicting a wild goat, from Nimrud, Iraq, 9th–7th century BC

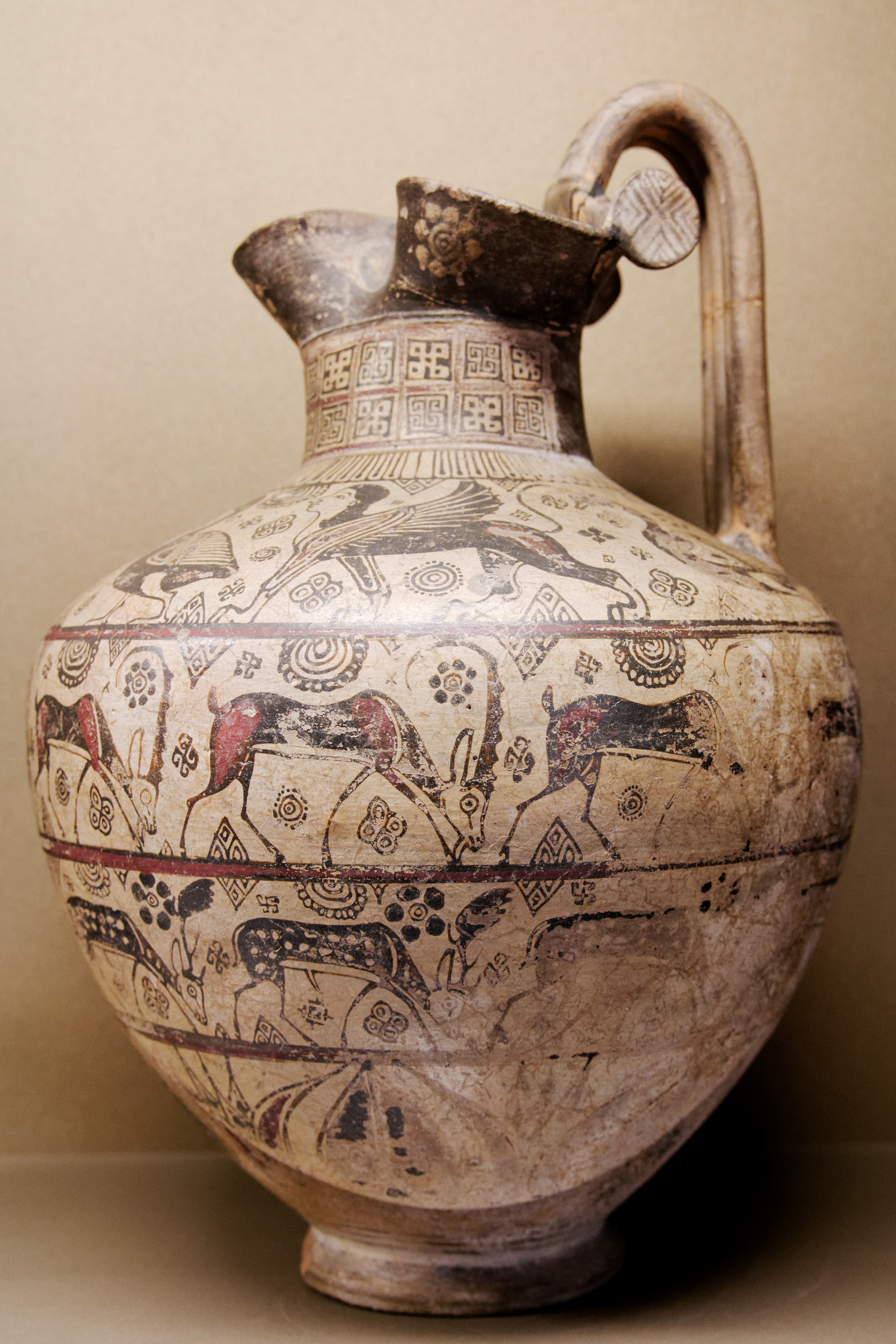
Ancient Greek oenochoe with wild goats, 625–600 BC

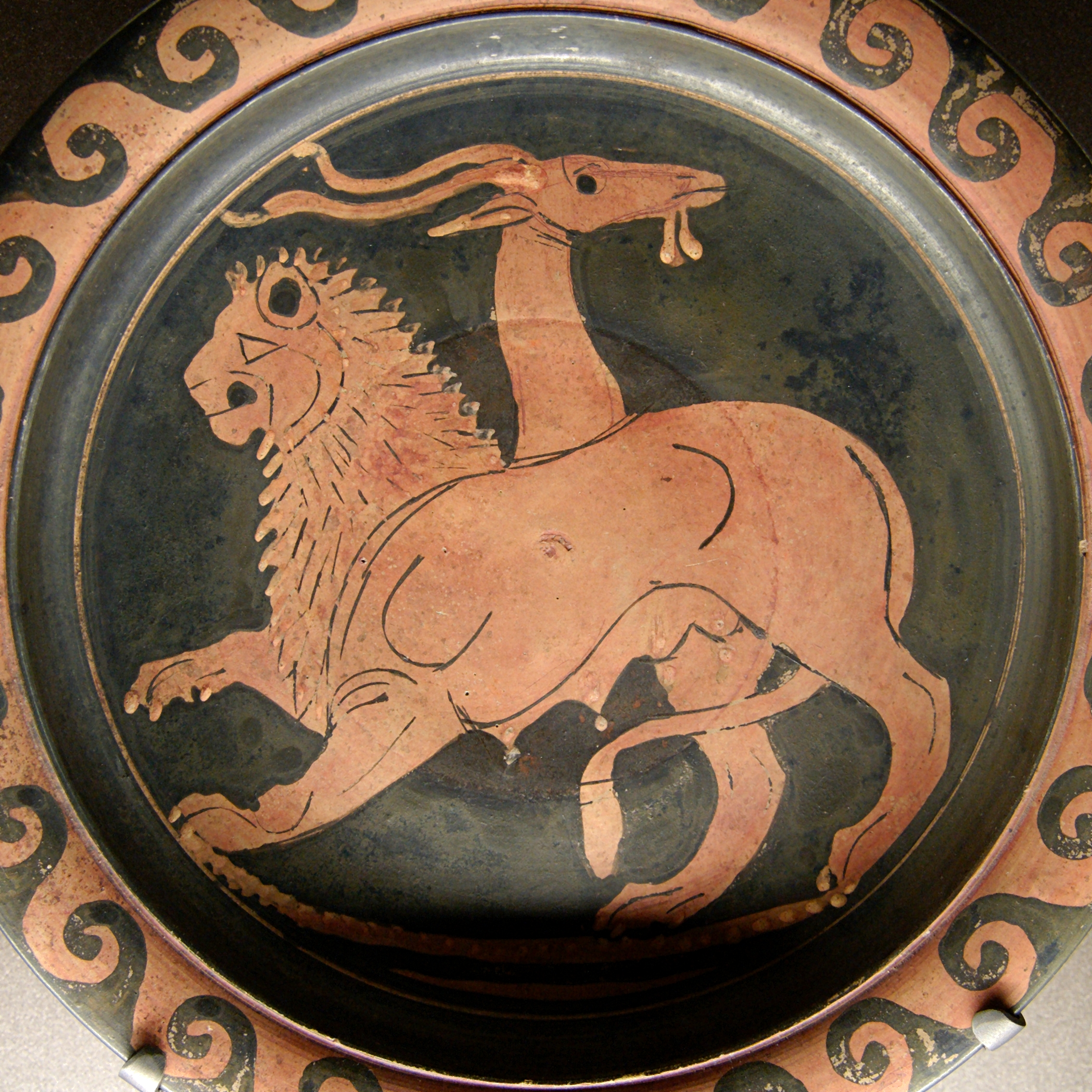
Goat-lion chimera on a red-figure plate, c. 350–340 BC

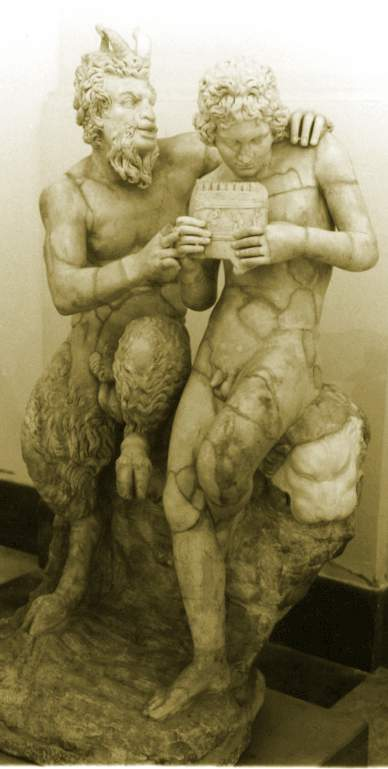
Pan teaching Daphnis to play his flute, Pompeii, c. 100 BC

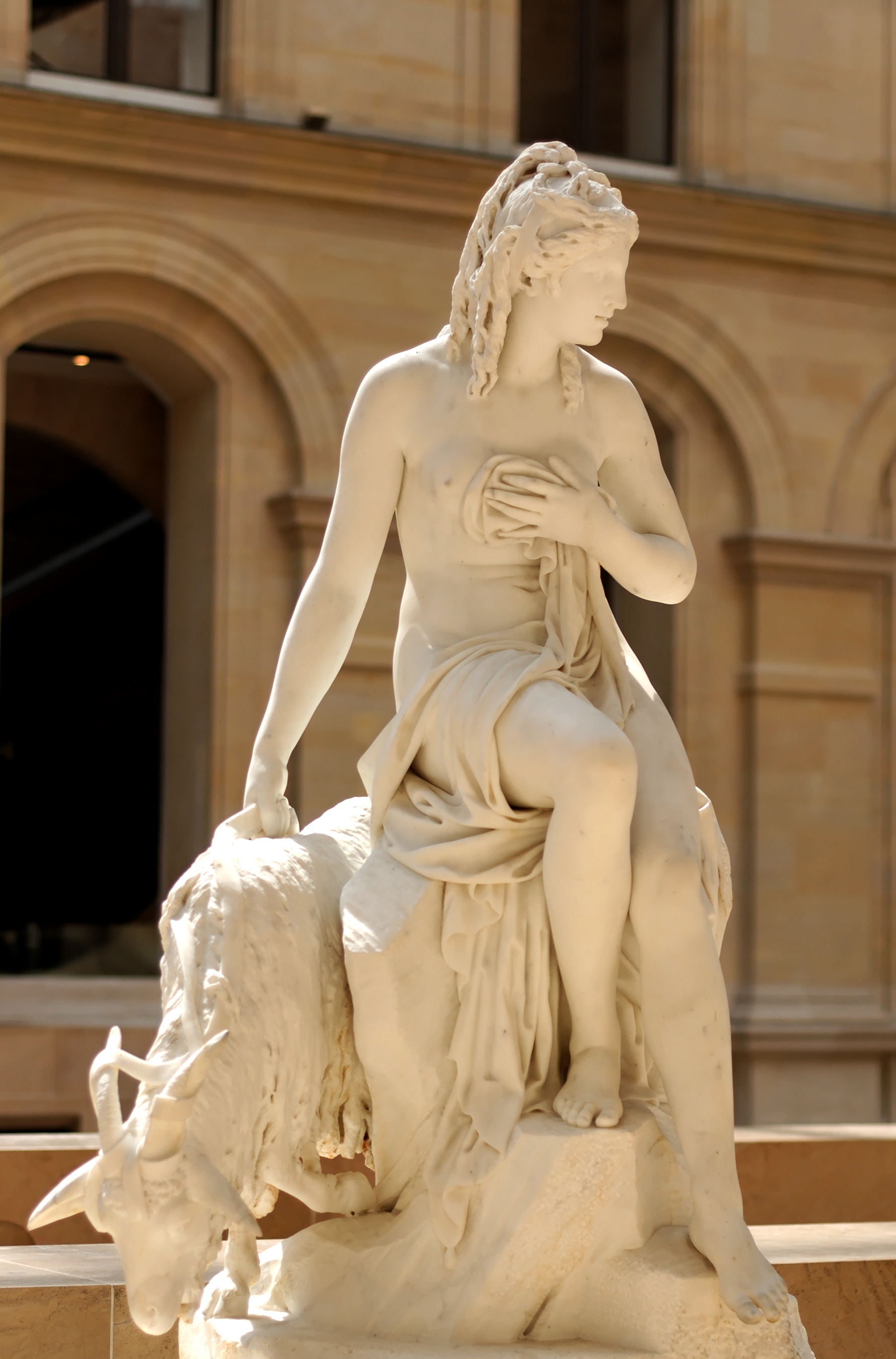
Amalthea and Jupiter's goat, 1787, at the French royal dairy, Rambouillet

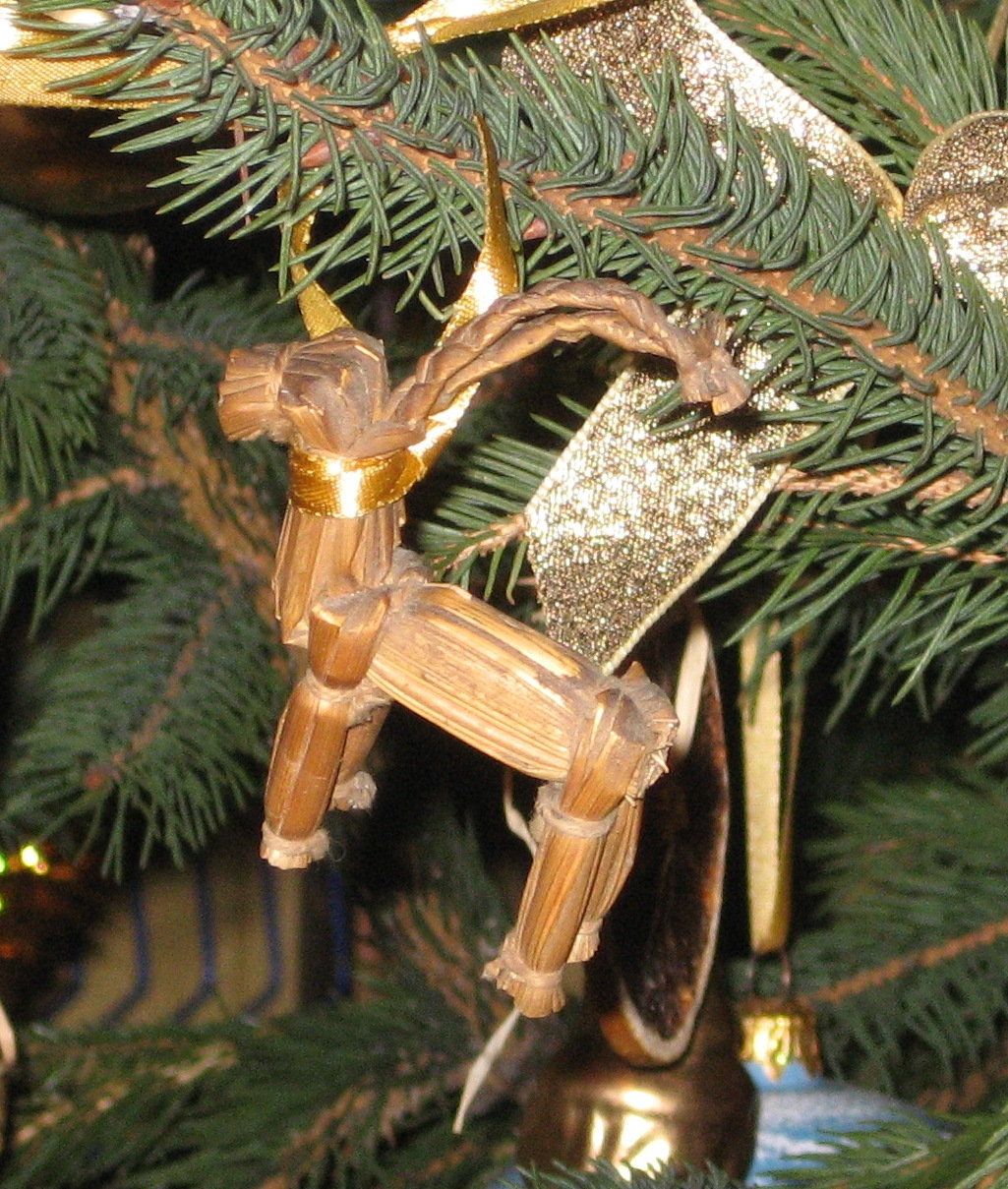
A yule goat on a Christmas tree in Scandinavia, 21st century

== See also ==
- American Dairy Goat Association
- Goat tower
