= Caprine arthritis encephalitis =

Viral disease of goats

Caprine arthritis encephalitis (CAE) is a viral disease of goats caused by a lentivirus called caprine arthritis encephalitis virus. The disease is found worldwide.

Two syndromes of CAE occur. Adult goats develop a chronic progressive arthritis, whereas young goats develop a neurological syndrome, with signs of paresis or paralysis. Less commonly, mastitis or pneumonia may occur.

Infection is life-long, and it may be years before signs of the disease occur. The reason for the long (and variable) period of dormancy of the virus is not known.

In goats which develop arthritis, the joints become inflamed and swollen, and the goats will slowly lose condition. In some cases the goat will not be able to stand.

In goats which develop the neurological form of the disease, the onset of signs is gradual over several weeks. The hind legs are most often affected. The goat will be uncoordinated, and unable to place its feet properly, so that it "knuckles", that is, it stands with the front of its fetlock on the ground, rather than its hoof. The goat has increased difficulty standing and eventually is unable to stand.

The disease is spread to goat kids when they drink colostrum or milk from infected goats. Separating goat kids from infected goats, and feeding the kids with cow's milk, or pasteurized goat milk, will prevent infection. The disease can be spread from goat to goat via direct contact and body fluids, such as saliva. Blood testing goats for CAE virus before moving them into a new herd will prevent the spread of the disease.

There is no known cure. To prevent spread of the disease, infected animals are separated from non-infected goats, or culled.
