= Center for American Education =

Center for American Education (CAE) was the old name referring to the American style educational institutions in Asia. These institutions have changed their names:

- American College of Dubai; formerly known as Center for American Education, Dubai. It is usually confused with American University in Dubai.
