= American Dairy Goat Association =

- Nickname: ADGA
- Pronunciation: Add-Gah
- Formation: 1904
- Location: Spindale, North Carolina
- Members: 20,000
- Website: https://adga.org

The American Dairy Goat Association or ADGA is a United States not-for-profit corporation dedicated to dairy goats. Its purpose is to promote the dairy goat industry, by providing and circulating sound information about goats and goat's milk; maintaining and publishing herd books and production records of milk goats; and issuing certificates of registration and recordation; improving and developing the milk goat breeds; and providing publicity and service for the goat dairying industry. The principal operation of the corporation is in Columbia, Missouri, and its headquarters are in Spindale, North Carolina.

== History ==
The association was organized in 1904 as the American Milch Goat Record Association, and published its first herd book in 1914. It published Volumes 11-23 of the American Milch Goat Record in 1921; a comprehensive compilation of details on its registered animals. According to the Missouri Secretary of State, the nonprofit corporation was created on January 15, 1944, as the American Milk Goat Record Association. On 22 July 1965, its board accepted a proposal to change the name of the organization from its original name to its present name.

=== Historical records ===
Many of the historical records kept by the association were in bad shape from age and mold. The association transferred these records to the United States Department of Agriculture's National Agriculture Library Dairy Science Collection for historical preservation. The records date from 1914 to the 1950s with some dating as late as the year 2000.

== Membership ==
As of 2015, membership in the American Dairy Goat Association exceeded 15,000 regular members.

== Breed registry ==
The ADGA maintains separate official herd books for purebred herds and American breed herds. These are official lists of registered animals. A purebred goat is one that has been born of a purebred sire and a purebred dam of the same breed and conforming to breed standards. An American breed goat is one born to a sire and dam of the same breed, going back a minimum of three generations for does and four generations for bucks.

There are eight currently registered ADGA breeds for which the organization issues certificates of registration and maintains herd books and production records: seven standard size breeds Alpine, Guernsey, Lamancha, Nubian, Oberhasli, Saanen, Sable, and Toggenburg, and one miniature breed, the Nigerian Dwarf.

The standard size breeds can be registered in the Purebred and American herd books for their breed, and crosses between these seven may be recorded in Recorded Grade Herd or Experimental Herd books. Lamancha and Sable breed goats have 'open' herd books, which means grade (or nonpedigreed) goats of these two breeds can be 'bred up' to established purebred registry standards and then registered as usual. Nigerian Dwarf goats are registered only in a purebred herd book and there are no provisions for 'breeding up' grade goats of this breed. Offspring of a Nigerian Dwarf goat which are the product of a cross with a standard size breed or any other breed may not be recorded in any ADGA herd books. No breed purebreds or crosses with Boer, Angora, Pygmy, Cashmere, or any other types of goats are accepted for registration.

The association initially preferred registered goats to be descended from known European breeds, but was willing to accept upgraded goats as well. In addition to its eight currently registered breeds, the ADGA at one time registered several other breeds that are no longer available in North America, including the British Alpine goat, the Calcutta Llama, the Indian goat, the Maltese goat, the Murcien or Murciene, the Norska goat (and other Norwegian breeds), the Rock Alpine goat, the Rome goat, the Royal Murciana goat, and the Schwartzenberg-Guggisberger goat.

== See also ==
- American Goat Society
- Goat
- Dairy goats
