= American Lamancha =

Breed of dairy goat

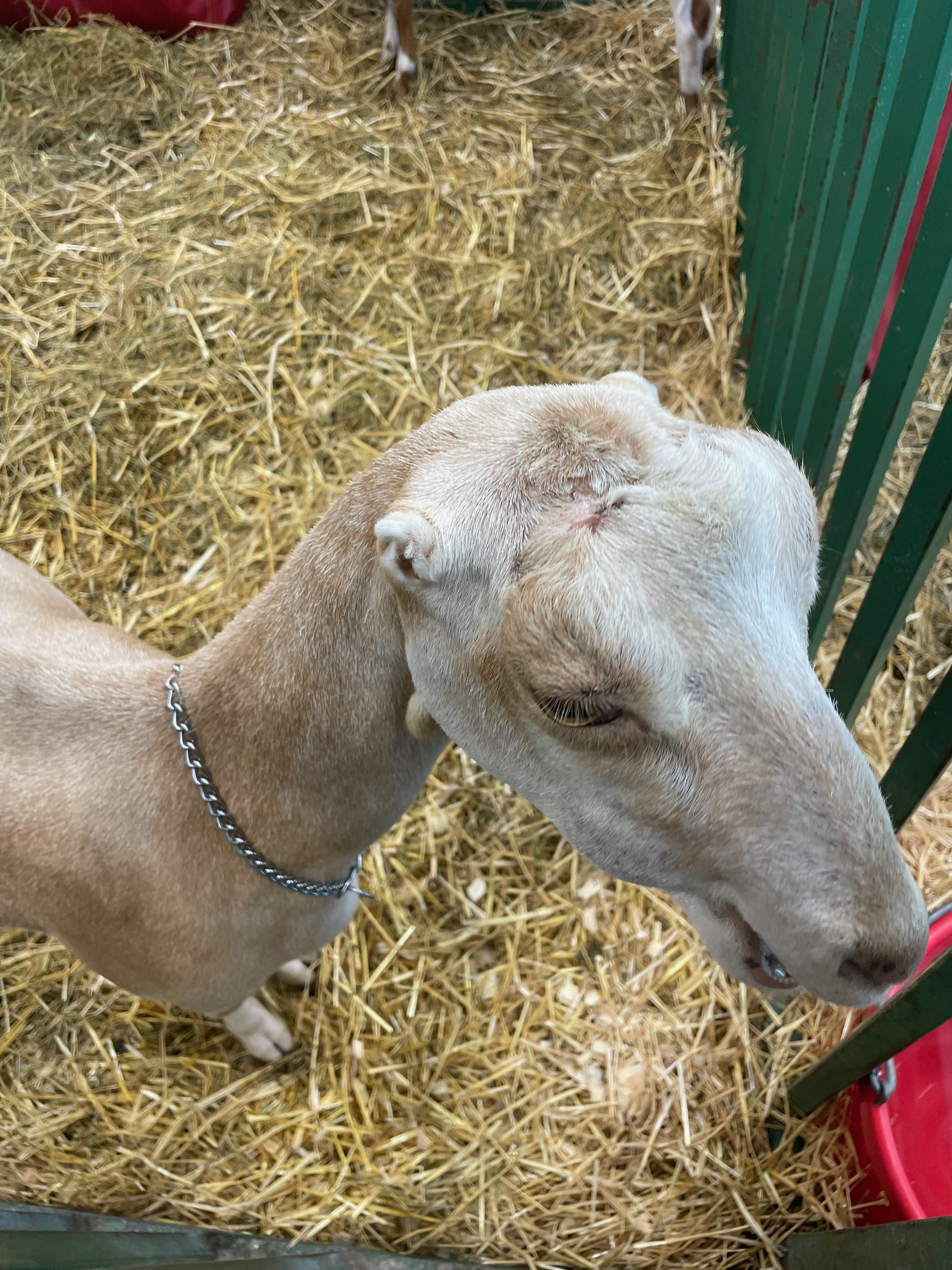
- Head of a doe with gopher-type ears and wattles
- Country of origin: United States
- Use: milk

Traits
- Goat; Capra aegagrus hircus

American Lamancha, or more commonly, simply Lamancha or LaMancha goat, is a formally recognized breed of dairy goat, first bred in California by Mrs. Eula Fay Frey about 1927. Later she moved the herd to Glide, Oregon for further development. The Lamancha goat is a member of the Capra genus, specifically Capra aegagrus hircus (sometimes called Capra hircus), like all domestic goats.

Lamancha goats are perhaps the most distinctive goat breed; easily recognizable by their very short ear pinnae. They are also known for their high milk production, the comparatively high butterfat content in their milk, and their people-loving temperament. The short-eared American Lamanchas first gained recognition as a distinct breed in the early 1950s, and the breed was registered formally on January 27, 1958 as "Lamancha or American Lamancha" goats. Approximately 200 animals were accepted at registration as its original stock. The first true American Lamancha goat registered was named Fay's Ernie, L-1.

The Lamancha goat is the only breed of dairy goat developed in the United States. Although it is interesting folklore and short eared goats do run throughout history, there is not a breed known as the Spanish Lamancha. The term "American Lamancha" is an ADGA term which denotes a goat that is mostly Lamancha but has unknown genetics or varied genetics of other purebred goats.

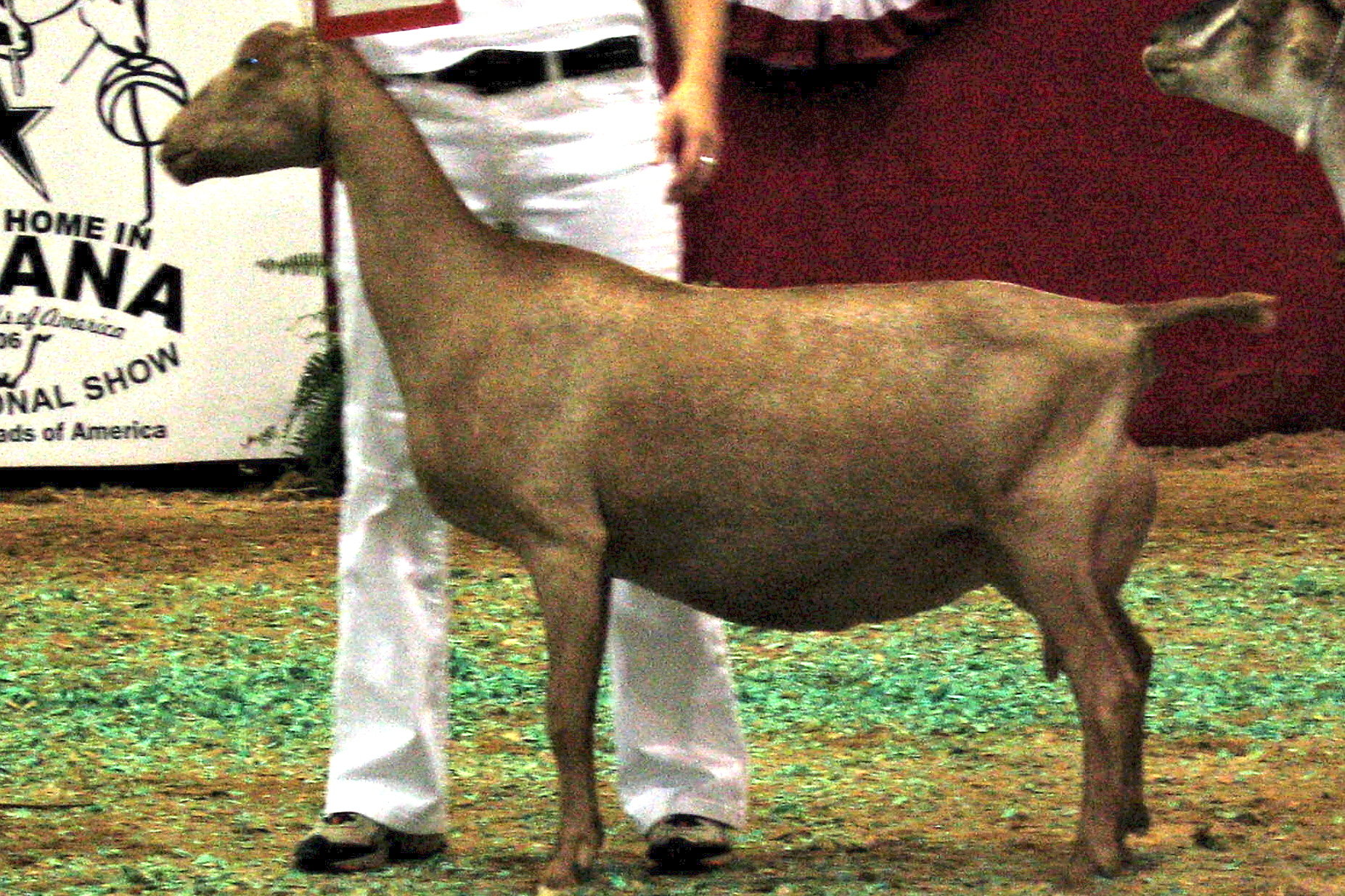
Doe in the show ring

== Color ==
Lamancha goats may be any color known to occur in goats.

== Ears ==
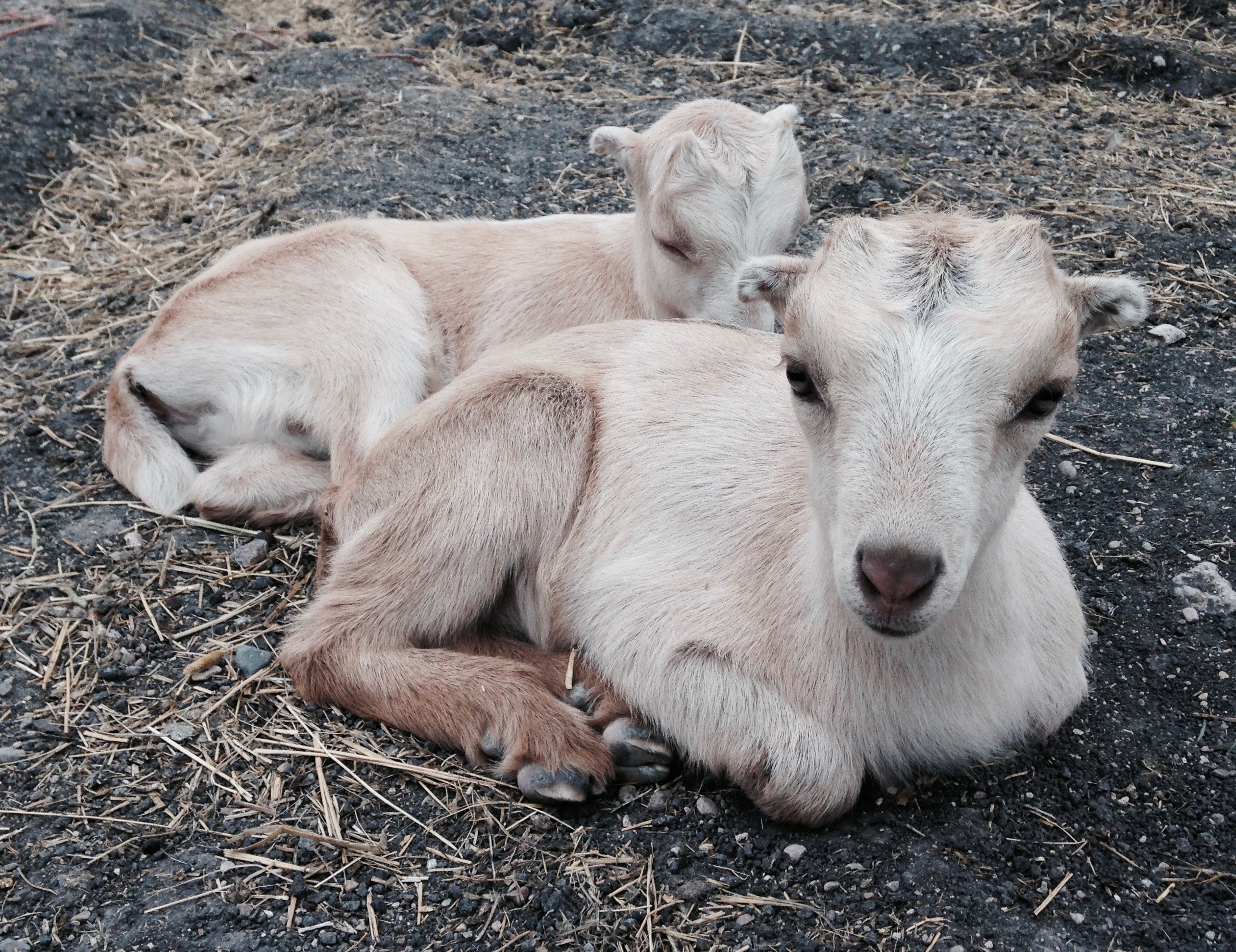
Kids with elf-type ears

Modern Lamancha ear definitions, according to the American Dairy Goat Association (ADGA) breed standard are, "Gopher ear: An approximate maximum length of 1 inch but preferably nonexistent and with very little or no cartilage. The end of the ear must be turned up or down. This is the only ear type which will make bucks eligible for registration." "Elf ear: An approximate maximum length of 2 inches is allowed, the end of the ear must be turned up or turned down and cartilage shaping the small ear is allowed."

=== History of the ears ===
When first registered as a breed, there were four distinctly described types of ears cataloged as acceptable for Lamancha breed registry. These were two specific 'gopher' types; short and long, and two 'elf' types; regular Lamancha ears and Cookie ears. Short gopher ears were closest to the head, could have one fold (but no length), and gave a smooth appearance to the head. After 1960, these were the only ear-type that a registered buck could have. Long gopher ears were small and round-tipped, between one-half inch and one inch long, and accordion-folded, such that when pulled out flat and released, they would fold right back. The elf types were a little longer, but still very small compared to other breeds. Cookie ears, named by Mrs. Frey after the first goat born with such ears, were pointy-tipped and turned up and back toward the head; hugging closely to the head. Regular Lamancha ears were flat, stood out from the head, bent downward, and could be an inch or up to two inches long. Only Lamanchas with Swiss-type (long) ears were unregisterable.

Mrs. Frey's herd consisted mostly of regular Lamancha-eared and Cookie-eared goats, but the 1960 rule specifying only gopher-eared bucks did not disqualify pre-existing registered bucks, so her herd as it stood at the time remained registered, though later bucks born had to conform to the standard to be registered. In the early to mid-1980s, the breed standard was changed to define only two types of ears: gopher and elf.

== Ancestral bloodlines and breed history ==
The precise ancestral heritage of the Lamancha goat is still unknown, though references to short-eared goats date back as far as records from ancient Persia. Goats from La Mancha, Spain, which are now known as Murciana, were first exhibited at the World's Fair in Paris in 1904, labeled simply, "La Mancha, Cordoba, Spain." According to Goats for Dummies, Lamanchas were originally developed from Murciana ancestors imported to the U.S. from Mexico as dairy and meat goats. Mason's World Dictionary of Livestock Breeds speculates that the Spanish short-eared goats in their lineage may have been the Spanish-American Criollo goats; bred for both meat and milk and found principally in Mexico, Argentina, Bolivia, Peru, and Venezuela, which were imported to South America from Spain during the 16th century.

The registered Murciana whose bloodline ran through Mrs. Frey's herd was owned by Mr. and Mrs. Harry Gordon. The Murciana goat breed originated in the Murcia province along the Mediterranean coast of southeastern Spain, and while it is shorter eared than many goats, its ear is shaped like the Swiss breeds, such as Alpines, Oberhaslis and Saanens, and carried horizontally. This breed may have actually originated in Africa. Display ads in The Goat World of the time indicate that the Murciana goats were in the U.S. by 1920, referred to as the "Royal Murciana." Dr. C. P. DeLangle, in his article The Murcien Goat, printed in the August 1921 issue of The Goat World wrote of them, "The Murcien goat is one, if not the handsomest goats known." By 1936 the Murcianas may have become scarce, as the January issue of the Dairy Goat Journal called for help to reestablish the breed, noting that there did not seem to be a pure-bred buck in America and that a Mrs. Katherine Kadel had the only purebred does at that time. The same article noted also that a reliable supply of Murcianas could be found in Mexico, in a herd imported from Spain that also contained Granada goats.

Spanish missionaries who colonized California brought with them a short-eared breed of goat suitable for either milk or meat production, which was very similar to the Lamancha goat. They referred to these as "cuties," "monas," and "monkeys"; nicknames used affectionately by the Spanish for their "freaks." Seed animals from the initial herd were transplanted to each new mission, thus distributing these "monkeys" throughout the west. This strain of short-eared goats is generally assumed to be the progenitor of today's Lamancha goats.

At the end of the 19th century a Mrs. Phoebe Wilhelm of Mokelumne Hill in California kept a herd of descendants of this tribe of imported short-eared goats; propagating them only with purebred Toggenburg bucks from the herd of Jane S. White. Other registered-breed bucks became available in the US during the 1920s, such as Alpines, Nubians, and Saanens. After 1930, Mrs. Wilhelm bred her short-eared does using purebred Alpine and Nubian bucks from the Blue Ribbon herd of Mrs. C.R. John. Phoebe Wilhelm died between 1935 - 1940 and Edith Goodridge, known for her RioLinda herd, purchased 125 short-eared goats from her estate, which she noted were about half gopher-eared and half elf-eared. After 30–40 years of breeding short-eared does with long-eared bucks, the distinctive Lamancha-type ear had proven to be a strongly inherited trait.

Breeding type-to-type, using short-eared bucks, did not begin in earnest until the late 1930s. Until the early 1940s there is no other reference to anyone attempting to breed type-to-type to try to establish a true-breeding short-ear goat. The small ears evolved from a goat named 'Peggy' in Mrs. Eula Fay Frey's herd. Mrs. Frey and her husband bought Poplar Dairy in Bell, California in September 1937, after she had subscribed to and studied every 1937 issue of the Dairy Goat Journal seeking information about the health benefits of goat milk. Her husband, Jene, had developed stomach ulcers and she was determined to cure him, which she reportedly did on a strict diet of goat milk and tomato juice, although he died just a few years later in an automobile accident.

The Poplar Dairy had consisted of 130 goats, two of them short-eared Lamancha-style goats: a small roan-colored doe and her rich golden-brown son; an early 1937 kid named 'Tommy'. Mrs. Frey milked that doe just once, and was astonished by the quantity of milk produced by such a small doe. The Freys called the two 'short-ears'; not knowing what breed they might be. Several years later, they learned that the short-eared goats were descendants of a Spanish breed called Lamancha, brought to the US from Mexico, having earlier been brought to Mexico from the La Mancha plateau in Spain.

Mrs. Frey was more interested at that time in two first-fresheners in the herd; both Nubian-French Alpine does: tri-colored 'Rose' and smaller black-and-tan 'Toy'. The Freys agreed to use Tommy on the does whose kids they were not planning to keep. Rose was the last doe bred to Tommy and before she freshened on May 23, 1938, Tommy, his mother, and all of his offspring up to that point had been either sold or destroyed. Rose's kids by that breeding to Tommy were a Nubian-French Alpine looking buck, like his mother, and a beautiful short-eared doeling with curly golden-brown hair and very large eyes. The Frey's decided to keep her and named her 'Peggy'. Peggy was the first kid born into the Frey's herd with such ears and she turned out to be an outstanding milker, despite being a small doe. Unofficial milk production records kept by Mrs. Frey showed that Peggy produced ten to twelve pounds of milk a day, with fourteen pounds on her record day; just shy of two gallons. She was Fay Frey's pride and joy and was taught several tricks. Louise Erbe of K-Lou ranch remembered seeing Mrs. Frey parading Peggy around on a leash. Rose lived to be sixteen years old and was then put to sleep.

Peggy was bred to 'Jim', another Nubian-French Alpine cross, yielding a short-eared buckling, a short-eared doeling, 'Pauline', and a doeling that looked like Jim, 'Paulette'. They destroyed the buckling and kept the does. At two months old, Pauline, the short eared doe, was badly injured by some of the other goats and destroyed. Paulette, the Nubian-French Alpine-looking doe, was bred to 'Christopher', a bright red Nubian-Murciana cross buck. That pairing yielded 'Redette', a doeling that looked like her father and later, with a buck named 'Scamp' gave birth to 'Gilda', a beautiful short-eared Lamancha that died young from over-production of kids and milk. Paulette's second freshening, with her father Jim, yielded three bucklings, of which the Freys kept one, naming him 'Rascal'. Rascal was paired with a purebred Toggenburg doe, producing Scamp, Peggy's grandson, who was bred to his older half-sister Redette and fathered Gilda. Peggy's third freshening, with her daughter Paulette's previous partner, Christopher, yielded three red short-eared Lamancha bucks, of which none were kept; a mistake, Mrs. Frey wrote later, that she regretted.

About 1940, Mrs. Frey purchased a short-eared doe from the Goodridge herd, and called her 'Nesta'; a small, beautiful doe with big milk production. Nesta yielded many of the goats in Mrs. Frey's herd of 1960; extant when she wrote her detailed history for Dairy Goat Journal. Nesta and Peggy were the matriarchs of the Frey herd and the mothers of the entire breed.

The second of the two original short-eared goats, Toy, was bred to Rascal, yielding 'Wretha', a short-eared doe, who was bred to a purebred Nubian buck to produce 'Cookie', the namesake of one of the original ear-names. Cookie was bred to a purebred French Alpine, producing 'Wafer', the first cou blanc Lamancha. Cou blanc is a breed color designation for Alpine goats, the standard for which is "literally 'white neck'; white front quarters and black hindquarters with black or gray markings on the head." Wafer was bred to Scamp, yielding daughters Polly & Jolly, who also contributed many goats to Mrs. Frey's 1960 herd. Polly died before the Lamanchas were recognized as a breed, but Jolly, formally known as Fay's Jolly L-2, lived to become one of the original 130 goats in the American Lamancha foundation herd.

Mrs. Fry described her breeding program as follows:

"The goal that I aimed at in breeding American La Manchas was a breed that was able to produce 3½ to six quarts of fine-flavored milk with 3.5% or more butterfat over a period of one to four years between freshenings. They should have the w-way wedge body, strong legs well-placed, udders well-attached, both front and back, good barrel, short sleek hair, any color or combination of colors, horned or hornless, and head the size of Toggenburgs."

After breed recognition, the Lamanchas became known as American Lamanchas.

M. A. Maxwell and Ted Johnston helped Mrs. Frey pick out the members of her herd that would become the foundation herd for the breed. American Milk Goat Record Association (AMGRA) officials set up the American Lamancha herd book.

Polly was bred to 'Max', an unregistered Saanen, son of 'Hercules of Wasatch' and 'Della Cream Puff', which brought Fay's Pollyette L-63 and three brothers. As of 1960, Fay's Polyette was owned by Mr. & Mrs. R. W. Soens. The Soen's goats, called the Bomar herd, were the first Lamanchas east of the Rocky Mountains and the first herd on milk test.

Another daughter of Wretha, and granddaughter of Toy, was 'Crocus'. Crocus and all of her descendants carry the Murciana bloodline prominently, which makes them excellent producers of milk that is especially rich in butterfat.

One of Rascal's daughters, and granddaughter to Christopher, was paired with a purebred Swiss Alpine, to produce a fine line of American Lamanchas, one of which was 'Mickey'. Mickey gave birth to Fay's 'Mickey' L-64, who was then bred to Fay's Ernie L-1, which yielded both Fay's 'Erna' L-76 and Fay's 'Myrna' L-77. As of Mrs. Frey's 1960 writing, Myrna was owned by a Mr. Amos Nixon.

Scamp was paired with a grade Saanen, to parent another good strain of Lamanchas and several other strains also branched off. One of Scamp's pairings yielded Rhonda, who was paired with Ernie L-1 to produce Darlene, born May 16, 1950. Darlene was bred with Scoundrel to produce Sharon, born in late 1952.

Mrs. Frey kept several of her bucks born in 1954, some as wethers. The same year, she bought 36 Lamanchas from an Ira D. Peel, who had procured them at a sale. That small herd was culled; keeping just a few and only one of the seven bucks. Said Mrs. Frey of this acquisition, "There were some real good animals in this group."

When her Lamancha herd had increased to several does and two or three bucks, Mrs. Frey carefully paired other breed bucks to her Lamancha does, and the best does of the other breeds as well as the cross-breeds were paired with her Lamancha bucks. Christopher, the Nubian-Murciana cross, figured prominently in these pairings, distributing the Murciana heritage across the emergent herd. Her approach to breeding was to always select the best purebreds and grades to breed into her herd and she selected from many distinguished herds. Some of these were the Chikaming, Decor'OChevonshire, Del-Norte, Delta, Hurricane Acres, MacAlpine, Oakwood, Rio Linda, Silver Pine, and Silvergate herds; to the breeders of which Mrs Frey expressed deep gratitude." 1957 was the last year that she used other breeds in her breeding program; from that point forward, she bred American Lamanchas to American Lamanchas. "

She harnessed a pair of her wethers as a team to pull her in a miniature covered wagon in the Oregon Centennial Parade at Roseburg, Oregon on June 20, 1959. Mrs. Frey's main breeding buck in the early 1960s was Fay's Brit.

AMGRA bestowed upon Mrs Frey its Mary L. Farley Award on October 15, 1960, recognizing her years of work in developing the American Lamancha breed. Mrs. Frey died in 1968.

== Accolades ==
In 1960, the first Advanced Registry Lamancha does were listed in AMGRA Handbook AR6. These were five does from the Bomar herd, belonging to Mr. & Mrs. Soen:

- Fay's Blondie L-35, age 5 yrs - 301 2544 118.5
- Fay's Saucy Flossie L-45, age 6 yrs - 305 2308 106.7
- Fay's Mary Lou L-18, age 5 yrs - 305 2096 91.9
- Fay's Pollyette L-63, age 5 yrs - 305 2454 113.4
- Fay's Dusty L-21, age 6 yrs - 305 1465 64.4

1960 also saw the first Spotlight (national) Sale of a Lamancha goat, consigned by Mr and Mrs. R. W. Soens and purchased by Mrs. C. W. Channel of Arcadia, Florida, for $95

- Bomar Blondie's Golden Queen L-165

The 1961 AMGRA Handbook listed the first Lamancha doe to break 3000 pounds of milk on an official test. The record stood for twelve years. This doe was from Amos Nixon's herd:

- Fay's Spider L-85 4-0 305 3295 115.8.

The 1962 AMGRA handbook, Volume 8, listed Mrs. Frey's own Lamancha buck as the first Advanced Registry Herd Sire:

- Fay's Anthony L-6

1962 also saw the first entry of Lamanchas on the National Show scene. 31 goats entered the 1962 National Dairy Goat Show at the Los Angeles County Fair in Pomona, California, and were judged by George Procter. From this show emerged the first Lamancha National Champion; a five-year-old doe bred by Mrs. Dunlap and owned by the K-Lou Ranch:

- Midolane Little Francis L-198

That same goat was the first of any breed to repeat a National Show win, also in 1962, gaining the second leg toward her championship that year and also attaining *M (star milker) status; though she never became a permanent champion.

In 1973, a Lamancha doe owned by Steven Schack, topped the previous milk record:

- Tomahawk's Faith L1406 1-11 305 3408 97

In 1974, another Lamancha doe, this one owned by Ray Vieira, set a new all-time milk record:

- Goat City Marzipan 2*M L-1049 2-11 305 4510 156.

On August 27, 1977, three Lamanchas were consigned by Page Dewitt of Mesa, Arizona to the first ever Colorama Sale, held in Columbus, Ohio. The highest seller was a doe kid purchased for $410.00 by Roger and Kay Bowers of Conover, Ohio:

- DeWitt Lenae

The Colorama Sale itself was named after a Lamancha doe. She was consigned to the 1970 Spotlight Sale at Pomona, California by Amos D. Nixon and was purchased via telephone by Dr. Richard H. Stoneback. As the ADGA National Sales Committee was considering catchy new names for its new national sale in 1977, to be held in conjunction with the ADGA National Show in Columbus Ohio, several names were considered before they settled, with permission from her owner, Mr. Nixon, on the "colorful" name of the doe that had been consigned to that 1970 Spotlight Sale:

- Nixon's Miss Colorama L1086

The foundation herd still lived with Mrs. Frey in Glide in 1978.

A Lamancha doe was the first doe of any breed to be named National Champion three times; earning the award back-to-back-to-back, at the 1980, 1981, and 1982 National Shows:

- GCH Rocinante Kellie *M.

In 1982 also, a buck bred by Nancy Lake was the first Lamancha to top the Spotlight Sale, selling for $4,100:

- B Longden Acres C. Lucky Bid A/I
