= Tulsa Zoo =

Zoo in Oklahoma, United States

- Interactive map of Tulsa Zoo
- 36.20868°N 95.92978°W
- Date opened: 1927
- Location: Mohawk Park, Tulsa, Oklahoma, United States
- Land area: 85 acres (34 ha)
- No. of animals: 1,500
- No. of species: 436
- Annual visitors: 600,000
- Memberships: AZA, AAM
- Website: www.tulsazoo.org

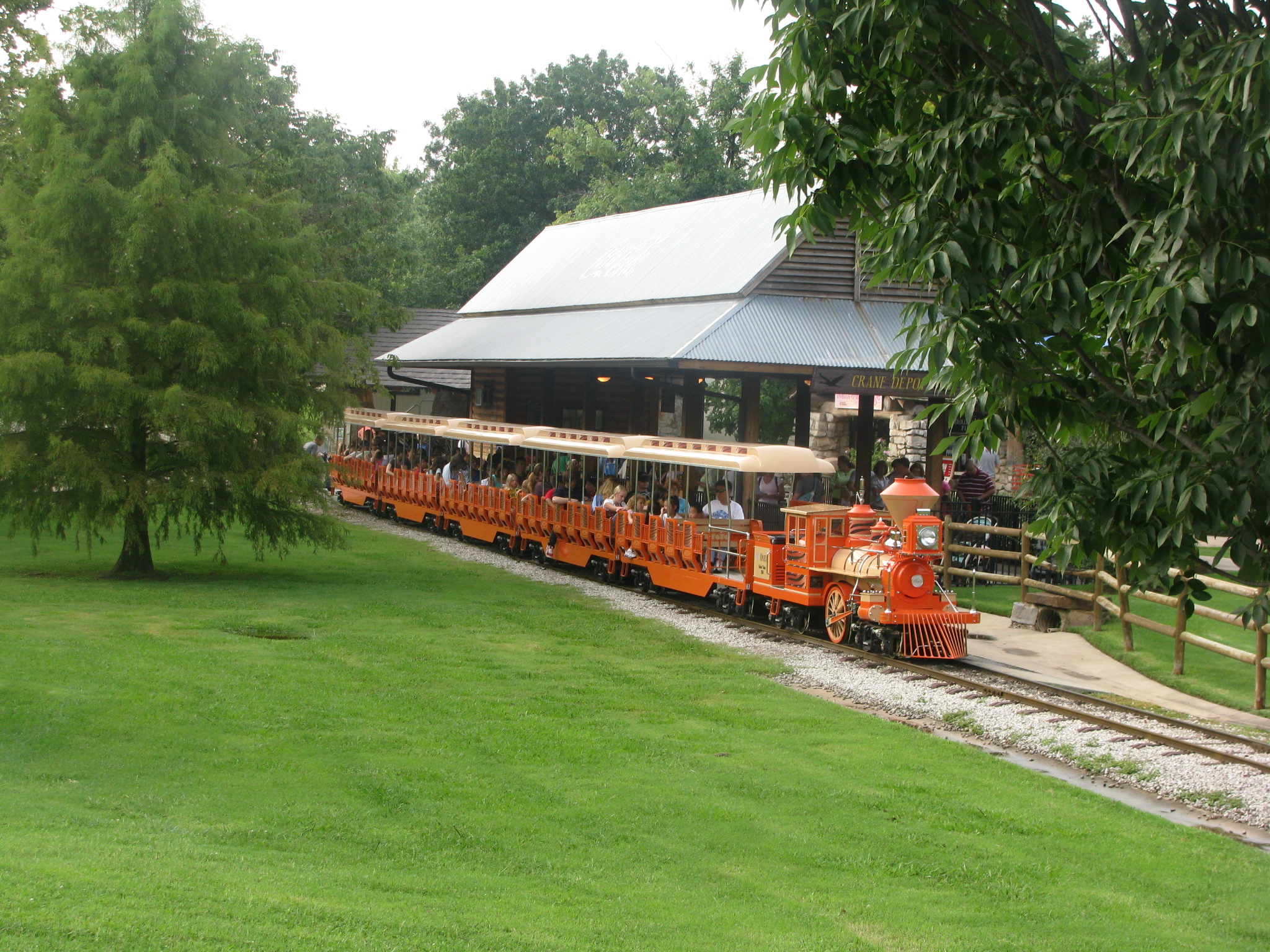
Zoo train

The Tulsa Zoo is an 84-acre (34 ha) zoo located in Tulsa, Oklahoma, United States. The Tulsa Zoo is owned by the City of Tulsa but since 2010 has been privately managed by Tulsa Zoo Management, Inc. The zoo is located in Mohawk Park, one of the largest municipal parks in the United States. The zoo is run as a non-profit.

The zoo hosts a variety of exhibits, including the Lost Kingdom complex and its Valley of the Elephant enclosure.

The Tulsa Zoo is accredited by the Association of Zoos and Aquariums through September 2028.

== Animals and exhibits ==
=== Lost Kingdom Exhibit Complex ===
Lost Kingdom presents gardens and settings inspired by ancient Asian cultures such as the city at Angkor-Wat and contains animals such as Malayan tigers, snow leopards, Chinese alligators, siamangs, binturongs, and Komodo dragons.

=== Lost Kingdom: Valley of the Elephant ===
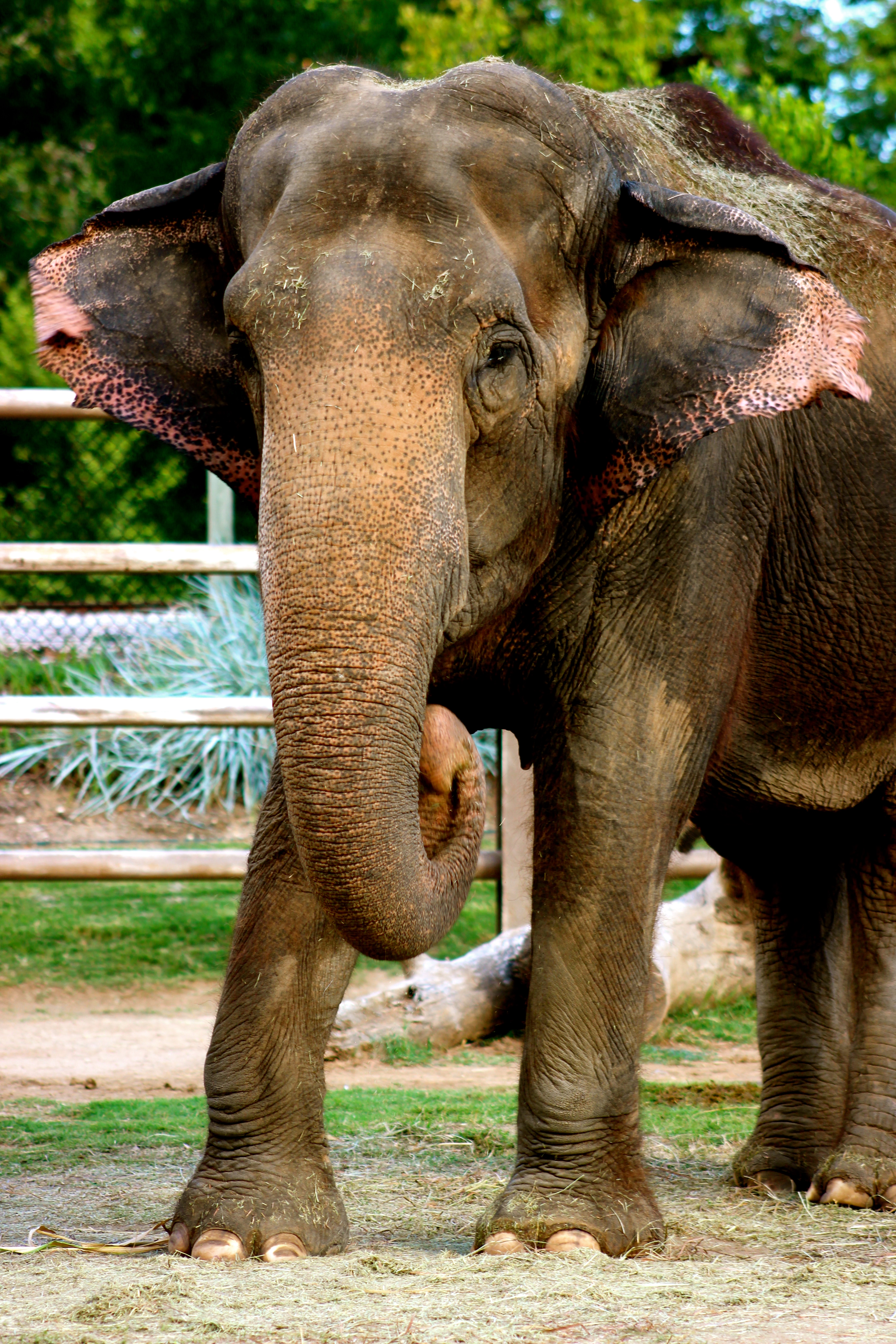
Gunda, who arrived at the Tulsa Zoo in 1954 has surpassed all staff and animals at the age of 67. She died in 2018.

The Valley of the Elephant encompasses a 2.5-acre (1 ha) area for the zoo's three elephants. Visitors can observe the elephants from indoor and outdoor viewing areas in an exhibit that includes an elephant demonstration yard. The zoo has five Asian elephants, two males (Sneezy and Hank), and three cows (Sooky, Booper, and Connie). Another pair (bull Billy and cow Tina), are due to arrive from the Los Angeles Zoo in 2025.

=== Robert J. LaFortune Wild Life Trek ===
The Robert J. LaFortune Wild Life Trek is a four-building complex, formerly the North American Living Museum, and focuses on animals from around the world and their adaptations to life in the water, desert, forest, and cold. Animals include Siberian cranes, tawny frogmouth, emerald doves, chinchilla, peccary, seahorses, and grizzly bears.

=== The Rainforest ===
The Rainforest is a recreation of Central and South American rainforests. Exhibits include species such as black howler monkeys, a green anaconda, piranhas, dwarf caimans, jaguars, and golden-headed lion tamarins. Many species roam freely, including rainforest birds, two-toed sloths, and Jamaican fruit bats. Throughout this exhibit is evidence of native cultures, from the Olmec Head marking the entrance to the exhibit to murals and structures incorporated within exhibits. The roof is composed of translucent panels to illuminate the canopy of the rainforest and a path that guides visitors through the building.

=== Chimpanzee Connection ===
This is the outdoor enclosure for chimpanzees containing a climbing structure consisting of cargo nets and ropes, caves, a termite mound, and vegetation. Completed in 1991, the "Chimpanzee Connection" building provides indoor viewing through glass.

=== Helmerich Sea Lion Cove ===
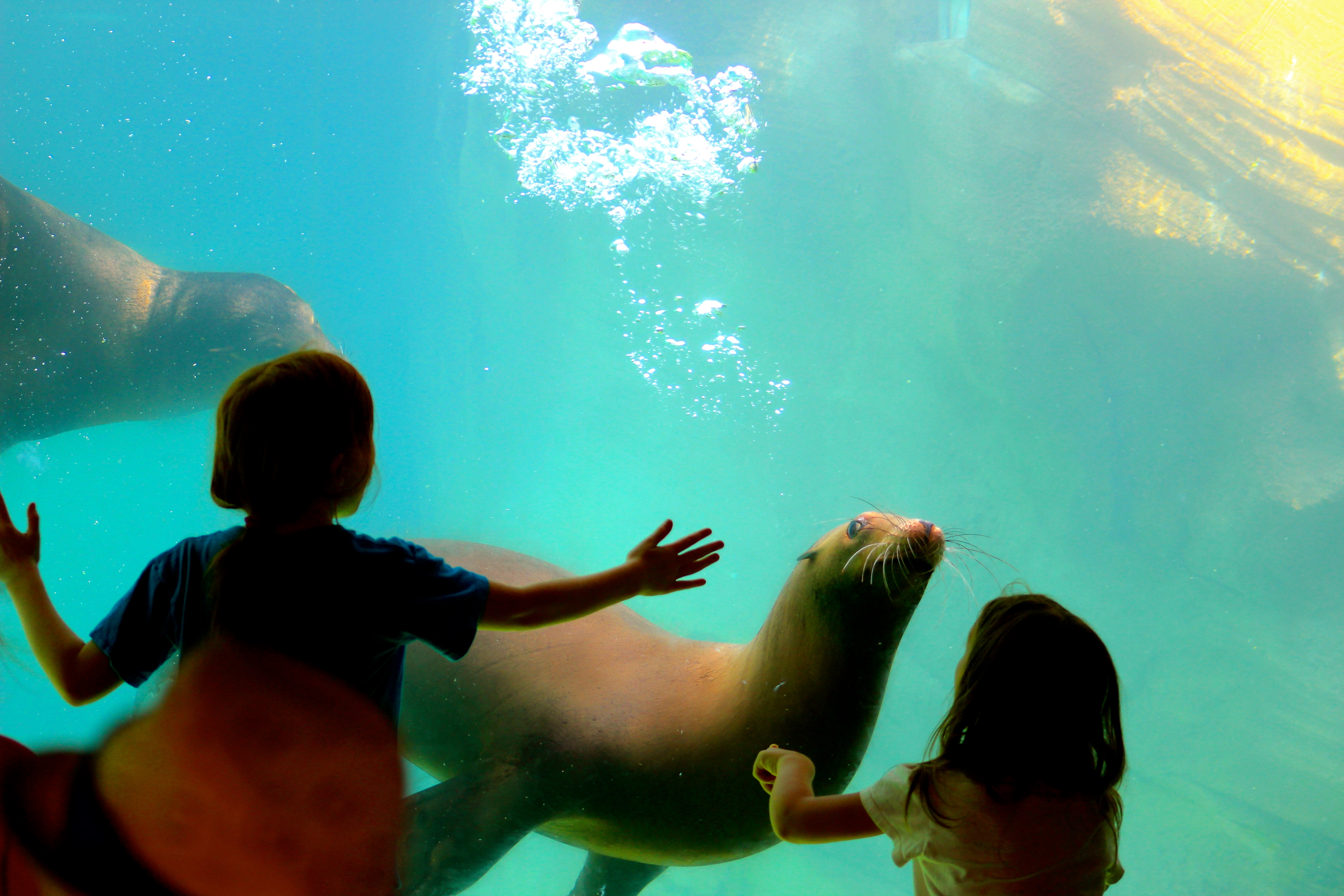
The under water viewing at Helmerich Sea Lion Cove allows a unique view of the salt water pool.

The Helmerich Sea Lion Cove is the enclosure for California sea lions that opened in 2012. The exhibit features a saltwater pool, an underwater viewing window wall, a waterfall, and rock haul-out areas.

=== Penguin Habitat ===
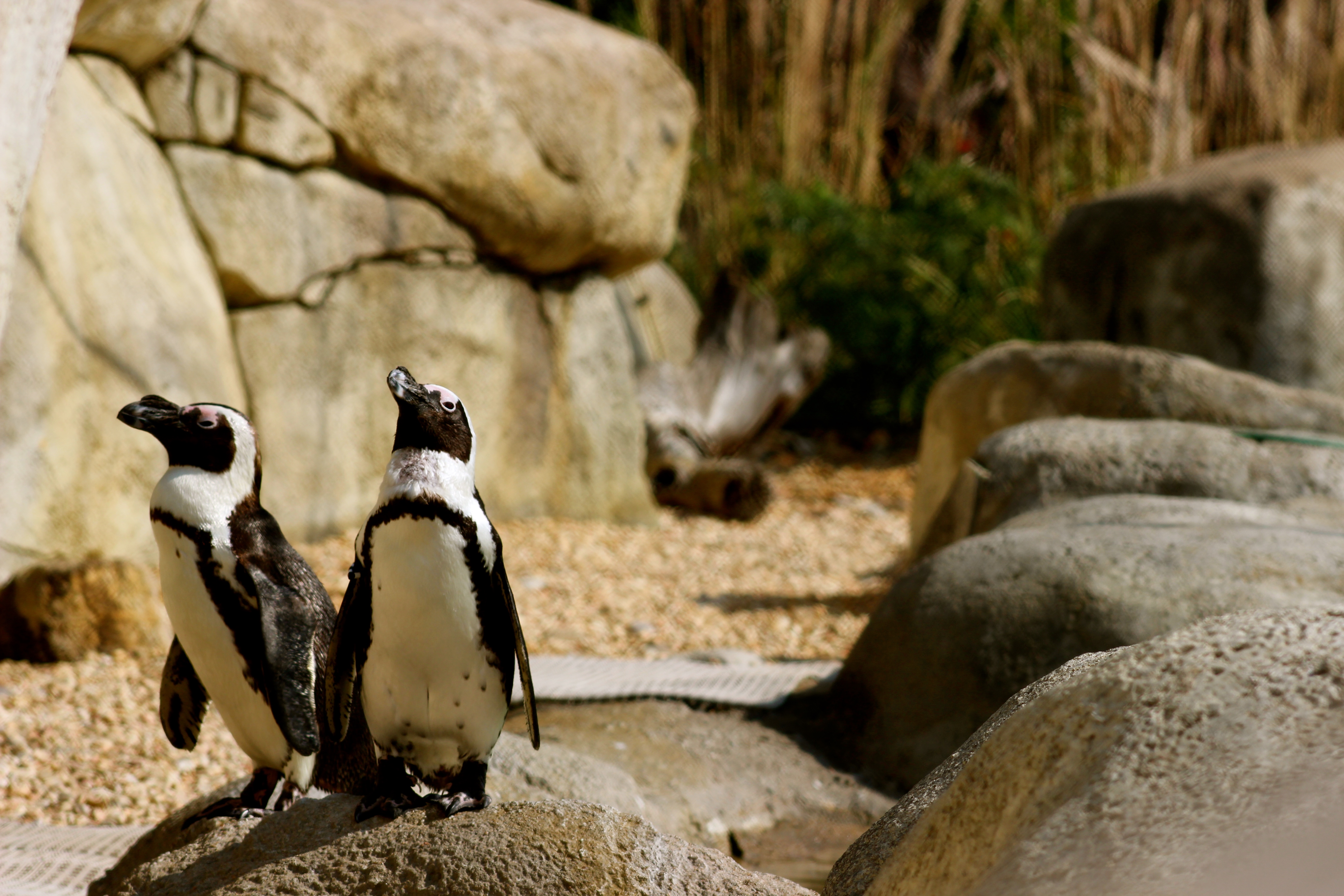
African Penguin Exhibit

The Zoo's Penguin Habitat exhibit opened to the public in 2002. The penguin enclosure is the foundation of "Oceans and Islands", an exhibit area for the zoo that includes an African penguin exhibit, a flamingo colony, and black and white ruffed lemurs. A wave pool or water action simulator, along with a rocky coastline setting, imitates their natural habitat.

=== African Plains ===
The African Plains area of the zoo features a variety of animals including meerkats, giraffes, lions, aldabra tortoises, southern white rhinos, and African wild dogs. The zoo recently opened the Mary K. Chapman Rhinoceros Reserve, which replaced an older facility and hosts the zoo's two white rhinos.

=== Children's Zoo ===
The Children's Zoo has a contact yard where visitors can get up close with Nigerian dwarf goats, Southdown sheep, Katahdin sheep, earless American Lamancha goats, and Anglo-Nubian goats. There are also dexter cows, miniature horses, and Guinea forest hogs. This exhibit also contains the Australian Outback Area, which has red kangaroos. The Children's Zoo also includes North American river otters.

=== Dave Zucconi Conservation Center ===
Constructed in 1957, the Conservation Center has a large variety of animals including primates, reptiles, birds, and fish. Some animals exhibited include American flamingos, wrinkled hornbills, giant snakehead, radiated tortoises, Diana monkeys, white-faced saki monkeys, Fiji banded iguanas, and a Grand Cayman Island blue iguana.

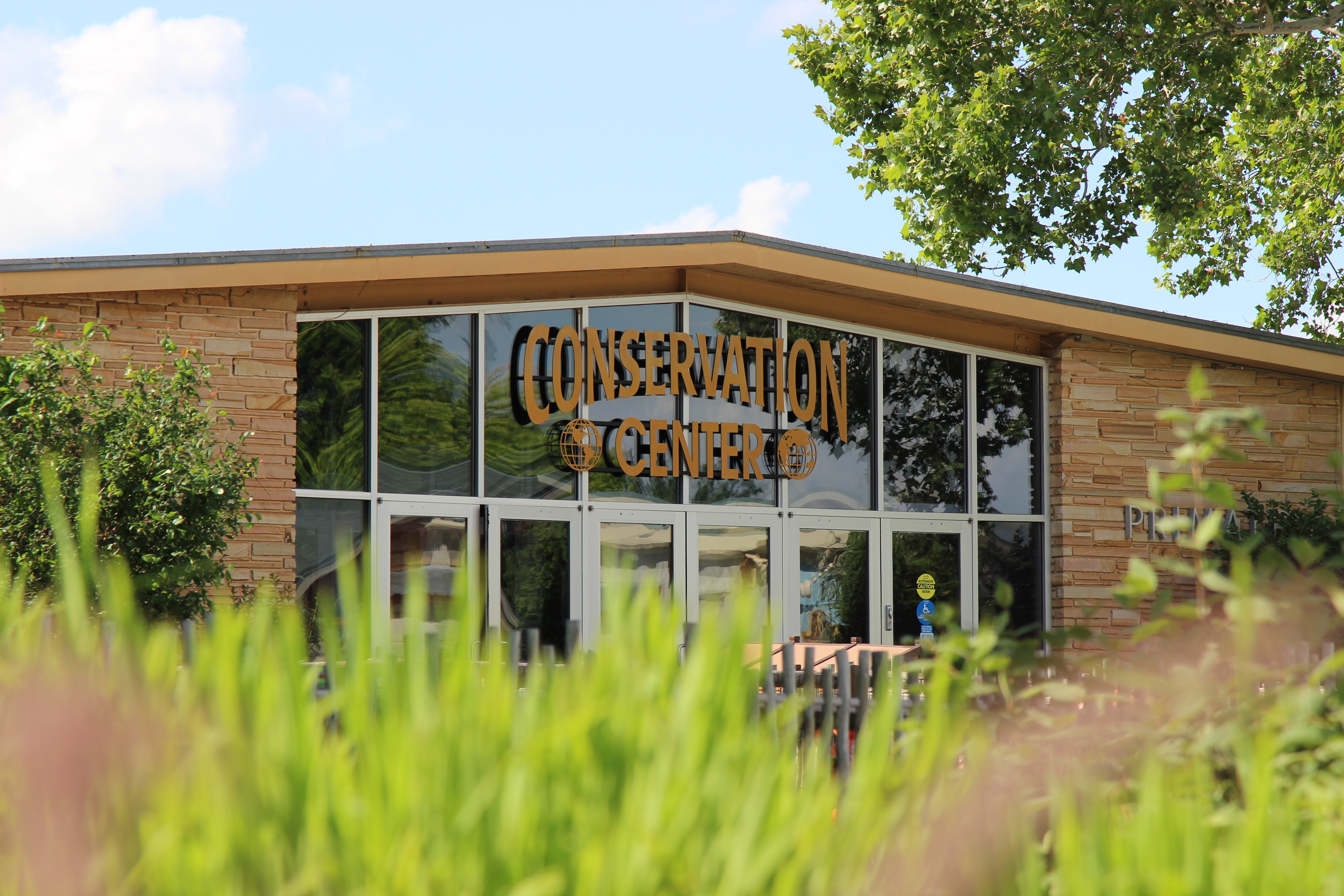
Originally named the Primate and Aviary Building, this midcentury structure is an example of modern 1950s architecture.

=== Tulsa Penguins On Parade ===
The African black-footed penguin exhibit was funded through a citywide art campaign, popularized by the gifting of 6-foot (1.8 m) sculptures, depicting a penguin with certain visual characteristics based on its location or owner, to businesses or organizations who donated to the exhibit. There were originally 29 of these sculptures throughout the city; they are popularly known as "Tulsa Penguins". One penguin sculpture was destroyed in 2021.

== Conservation efforts ==
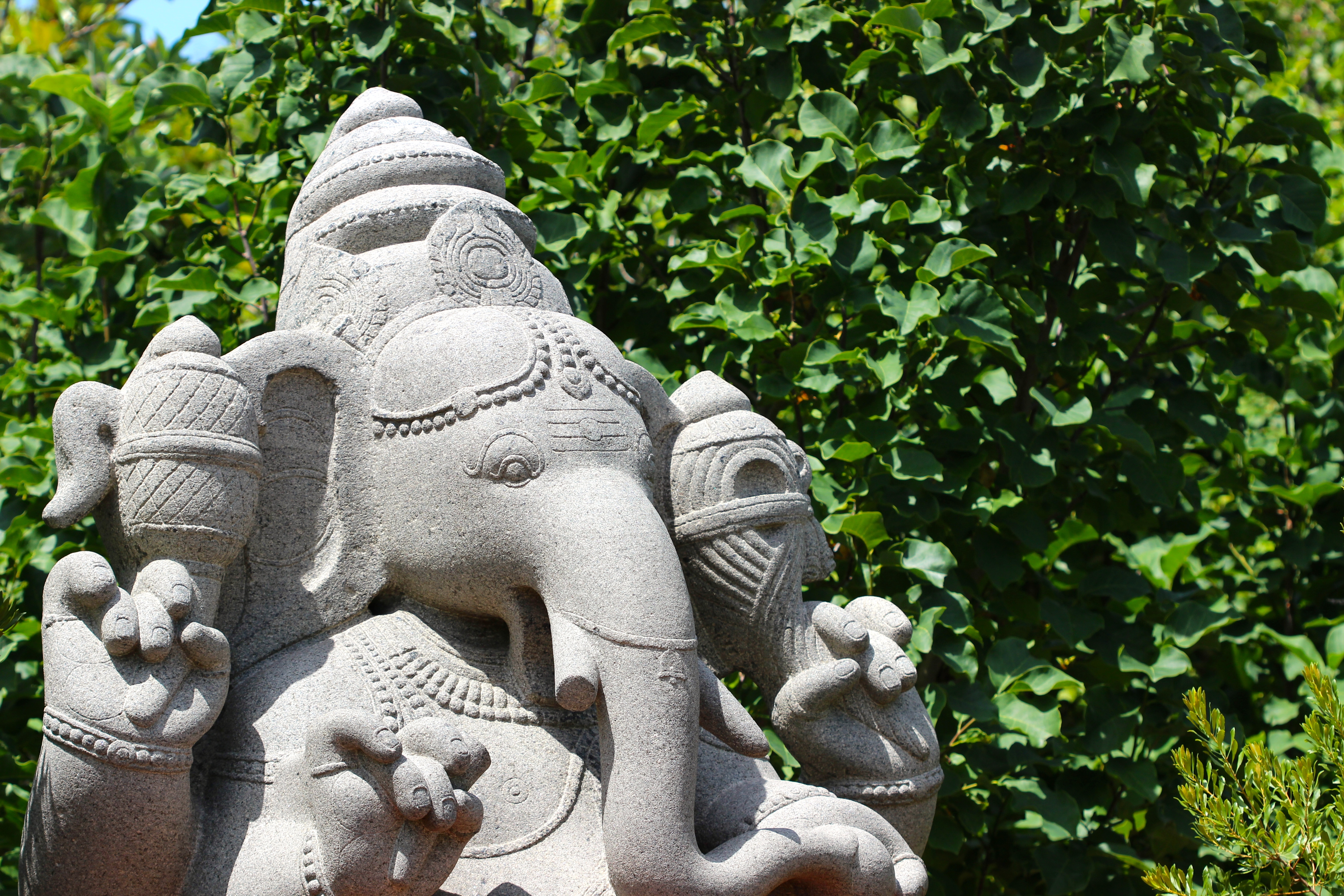
Ganesha statue

The Tulsa Zoo Conservation Program claims it has supported over 200 projects globally and locally, including a conservation education program to reduce the use of palm oil, FrogWatch USA, and ocean conservation education.

== Reception ==
In 2005, the Tulsa Zoo was named as "America's Favorite Zoo" by Microsoft Game Studios and was granted $25,000 in a contest designed to promote the Zoo Tycoon 2 computer game. The contest counted votes from zoo visitors across the country for many of America's top zoos, including the San Diego Zoo and the Bronx Zoo.

=== Controversies ===
The Tulsa Zoo attracted national media attention in 2005 when a group complained about the mention of evolutionary theory and the inclusion of religious icons, theories, and beliefs in zoo displays, including a statue of the Hindu elephant-headed god Ganesha as part of the elephant exhibition. The Tulsa Park Board responded by voting to add a display on Creationism. The board subsequently reconsidered and reversed its decision, citing widespread public criticism.

In 2009 and 2010, there were two giraffe deaths associated with the zoo. One died from a broken neck after being struck upon transport to the zoo, and another froze to death. The death of the second giraffe lead to a $5,000 fine from the USDA.

In 2025, there were protests at the Tulsa Zoo's acquisition of the L.A. Zoo's elephants Billy and Tina, with animal rights advocates saying they should have been moved to a sanctuary.

== History timeline ==
1927- Tulsa Zoological Society was incorporated

1931 - Monkey Island, with a population of 40 monkeys purchased at $7 each, was dedicated by Mayor George Watkins.

1939 - The current koi pond was completed by the W.P.A. as an alligator exhibit.

1950 - "Duke", the first chimpanzee at the Tulsa Zoo, arrived.

1954 - The zoo's first elephant "Gunda", a four-year-old female Asian elephant was donated by Tulsa Jaycees.

1957 - The Primate Aviary Building (currently called the Conservation Center), a $458,000 project was completed. Work also began on the $27,000 elephant building and yard.

1962 - A pair of reticulated giraffes, purchased by the children of Tulsa through the Tulsa World, arrived from the Oklahoma City Zoo. These were the first giraffes in the Tulsa Zoo.

1964 - The construction of the Cat and Bear Grottos along with the sea lion pool, and flamingo pool was completed. The zoo's first polar bear arrived.

1965 - The baby giraffe "Shakey" was born, and bottle-raised by the staff. The Tulsa Zoo became one of the few zoos in the nation to hand-raise several giraffes.

1966 - Hugh S. Davis, long-time zoo director of Tulsa, resigned.

1969 - David G. Zucconi assumed the duty of zoo director. Also, weekly appearances of zoo staff became a regular activity on the Uncle Zeb Show.

1970 - Computerized animal inventory system was established, making the Tulsa Zoo the second zoo in the nation to initiate such a program.

1971 - Tulsa Zoo Development, Inc. (TZDI) was chartered.

1972 - "Wildlife on Wheels" became the zoo's educational activity. A zoo admission fee was instituted.

1974 - A pair of white rhinoceros arrive at the zoo.

1975 - Air conditioning was installed in the Primate Aviary Building. Two female polar bear cubs were born. The first of their species at the zoo.

1976 - The previously called Mohawk Park Zoo was now officially named Tulsa Zoological Park. The Administrative/Technical Services Building and exhibit workshop was completed. The Tulsa Zoo was one of the first eleven zoos to be accredited by the AAZPA (presently named the Association of Zoos and Aquariums).

1977 - With the Children's Zooseum officially opening and the African Savanna under construction. The Tulsa Zoo also welcomed their first full-time staff Veterinarian position, and Sneezy, a four-and-a-half-year-old Male Asian elephant.

1978 - The Robert J. Lafortune North American Living Museum officially opened. The complex was neither a zoo, a museum, or a botanical garden; rather, it was a natural history facility that includes all the things common to those institutions with the goal of telling an integrated story about America's land and life.

1982 - The American Association of Museums awards their accreditation to the Tulsa Zoo. It became the 500th institution recognized. A new snow leopard exhibit is built.

1984 - Oklahoma's first man-made cave was completed in the Eastern Forest Museum Building. The Tulsa Zoo's exhibit department constructed the entire cave and received the AAZPA's prestigious Significant Achievement Award.

1986 - The Tulsa Zoo celebrated the birth of a healthy male Asian elephant "Maverick". Maverick was the first elephant born in Oklahoma and also the only Asian elephant born in the U.S. that year. The zoo also moved their two giraffes from the previous exhibit to a new one funded by TZDI.

1988 - Dr. Jane Goodall visited the Tulsa Zoo and declared the zoo's chimpanzee exhibit one of the "top three exhibits in the U.S." and welcomed the Tulsa Zoo into her prestigious chimpanzoo program, an honor claimed by only 15 zoos in the country. Dinosaurs Alive! also took place this year being the first dinosaur exhibit hosted by the zoo.

1990 - Mary Collins was hired as Tulsa Zoo Friends (formerly TZDI) new executive director. Also, with almost 700 party-goers, Waltz On The Wild Side kicked off its first year of fundraising.

Zoo director Dave Zucconi became president of the American Zoo and Aquarium Association.

1991 - Tulsa Zoo Development Inc. officially changed its name to Tulsa Zoo Friends, Inc. The indoor Chimpanzee Connection opened to the public.

1992 - Construction began on the new main entry, gift shop, elephant compound, commissary, exhibits building, animal reserve, and restaurant.

1993 - The Aldabra tortoise facility was completed. The Spotted Zebra Gift Shop, Safari Grille, and New entry officially opened. And Dinosaurs Alive! returned and welcomed 128,000 visitors in the three-month period. Maverick the Asian elephant died at age seven years after he contracted Elephant endotheliotropic herpes virus (EEHV), a fast-moving bacterial infection.

1994 - The Shark Aquarium was completed and the first bronze statue "The Frog" was installed.

1995 - The BOK Pavilion and the Boatmen's/BANK IV Amphitheater were completed. Also, the award-winning Elephant Encounter Museum which was funded by TZF and designed entirely by the exhibits staff was completed.

1996 - The Ethel F. Crate granite globe fountain was installed. The polar bear exhibit received a major renovation and the Helmerich Playground was opened.

1997 - The Helmerich Discovery Center was completed. The cheetah, meerkat and dik-diks exhibits were finished, and the Tropical American Rainforest exhibit opened.

1998 - The Children's Zoo contact yard opened, and the bull elephant viewing was installed. The Tulsa Zoo also held the AZA National Conference in September.

1999 - Siamang/langur habitat and overlook completed. Also, the black & white ruffed lemur exhibit was renovated.

2000 - Siamang Interactive Area for children was completed. The "Wings of Wonder" butterfly exhibit opened.

2002 - The African Penguin exhibit officially opened. It was dedicated in honor of Mary Collins; this won the ABC Excellence in Construction Award.

2003 - Conservation Center (formerly Animal Kingdom) was officially renamed.

2004 - A new Veterinary Hospital was complete. The Maasai exhibit in the African section of the zoo was also finished.

2005 - A temporary koala exhibit was added to the Conservation Center, and the Tulsa Zoo was awarded "America's Favorite Zoo" in the national competition by Microsoft.

2006 - The Oklahoma Trails exhibit was added in honor of Oklahoma's 100th birthday, and the North American Living Museum exhibited bison in honor of the Centennial.

2007 - A new Elephant Demonstration Yard was opened and dedicated to Larry Nunley for his 32 years of service to the zoo.

2008 - "Feather Fest" was added as a temporary free flight bird exhibit.

2009 - The HA Chapman Event Lodge opened.

2012 - Sea Lion Cove a new naturalistic sea lion exhibit was complete.

2013 - After years of renovations the former Robert J. Lafortune North American Living Museum reopened as the Robert J. Lafortune WildLIFE Trek. It no longer focused on only animals from North America but now animals from across the world with adaptations to living in the cold, desert, forest, and water.

2014 - The former Elephant Encounter Museum received a renovation and renaming to the Lost Kingdom: Valley of the Elephant Interpretive Center. Also, Zoorassic Park, a temporary dinosaur exhibit, displayed 15 animatronic dinosaurs. As the very first exhibit of the new 20-year master plan, the Mary K. Chapman Rhino Reserve opened.

2015 - A temporary dinosaur exhibit returned for its second year as Zoorassic Park 2. The zoo's largest fundraiser Waltz on the Wild Side celebrated 25 years of fundraising. The zoo was also featured nationwide as the top Instagram location in Oklahoma.

2017- Lost Kingdom Opened.

2018- Gunda, the zoo's first ever elephant, died at the age of 68 years from age-related health problems. She was among the oldest captive elephants in the country when she died.

2022- Construction of Oxley Family Elephant Experience and Elephant Preserve started.

2024- New Asian Elephant habitat opened.

2026- Tulsa zoo acquires four Arapawa Island goats, a critically endangered species; and two new African penguins hatched at the zoo.
