= National Dairy Goat Awareness Week =

- Begins: Second Saturday of June
- Ends: Third Saturday of June
- Duration: 1 week
- Frequency: annual

National Dairy Goat Awareness Week is an annual observance in the United States to promote awareness of dairy goats. Since 1988, when the United States Congress voted to officially recognize National Dairy Goat Awareness Week, it has been held each year between the second Saturday of June and the third Saturday of June. Local observances during that week include demonstrations of goat milking and hoof trimming, and goat obstacle courses.

== Background ==
Dairy Goat Awareness Day was first observed in 1986. United States Secretary of Agriculture Richard Edmund Lyng accepted an offering of six baby goats from the American Dairy Goat Association.

== Legislation ==
In 1987, North Carolina Senator Jesse Helms filed a resolution to set aside a week in June "to educate the American people to the potential of dairy goats and their products." The measure was co-sponsored by Senators Bob Dole of Kansas and Patrick Leahy of Vermont. On June 19, President Ronald Reagan issued Proclamation 5669, designating National Dairy Goat Awareness Week. The President praised dairy goats for their link with American history and their ability to thrive in harsh environments.

The United States Congress passed House Joint Resolution 423 in 1988, calling on the President to issue a proclamation declaring the period beginning the second Saturday of June and ending the third Saturday of June as National Dairy Goat Awareness Week. Reagan issued Proclamation 5834, praising the dairy goat's ability to efficiently convert "a wide variety of vegetation into nutritious milk and meat", and calling on people to observe the holiday with "appropriate programs, ceremonies, and activities."

In 1990, Governor James Blanchard proclaimed Dairy Goat Awareness Week in Michigan, honoring the 200 herds of registered goats in the state and their owners.
