= Great Plains Zoo =

Zoo in Sioux Falls, South Dakota, United States

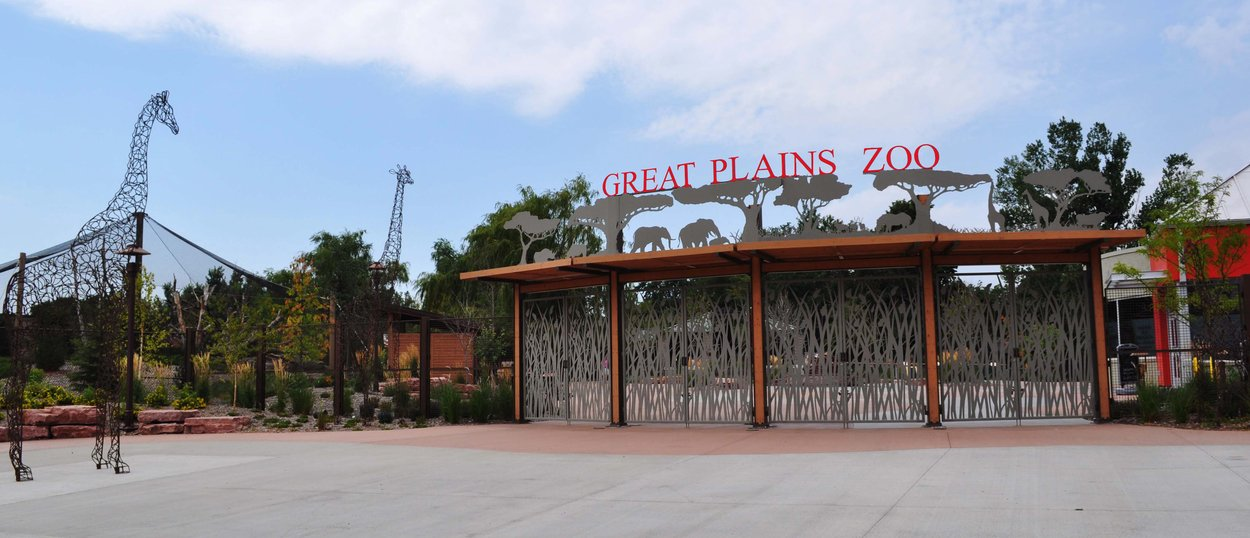
- Main Entrance
- Interactive map of Great Plains Zoo
- 43.5374°N 96.7648°W
- Date opened: 30 June 1963
- Location: Sioux Falls, South Dakota
- No. of animals: 1,000+
- No. of species: 137
- Annual visitors: 300,000+
- Memberships: AZA
- Website: www.greatzoo.org

The Great Plains Zoo is a 45-acre (18 ha) zoo located in Sioux Falls, South Dakota, United States. The zoo formerly was connected with the Delbridge Museum of Natural History, and prior to the closure of the museum, the museum displayed 150 mounted animals, including 38 "vanishing species". The Great Plains Zoo is owned and operated through a partnership between the City of Sioux Falls and the Zoological Society.

The City of Sioux Falls owns the infrastructure, land, and all assets associated with the Zoo and Museum and maintains the grounds. The Zoological Society of Sioux Falls, a non-profit, operates the facility, manages the animal collection, and maintains the grounds within the exhibit. The mid-sized Great Plains Zoo was awarded the "Quarter Century Award" by the Association of Zoos and Aquariums (AZA) in 2016, marking 25 years of continuous accreditation.

== History ==
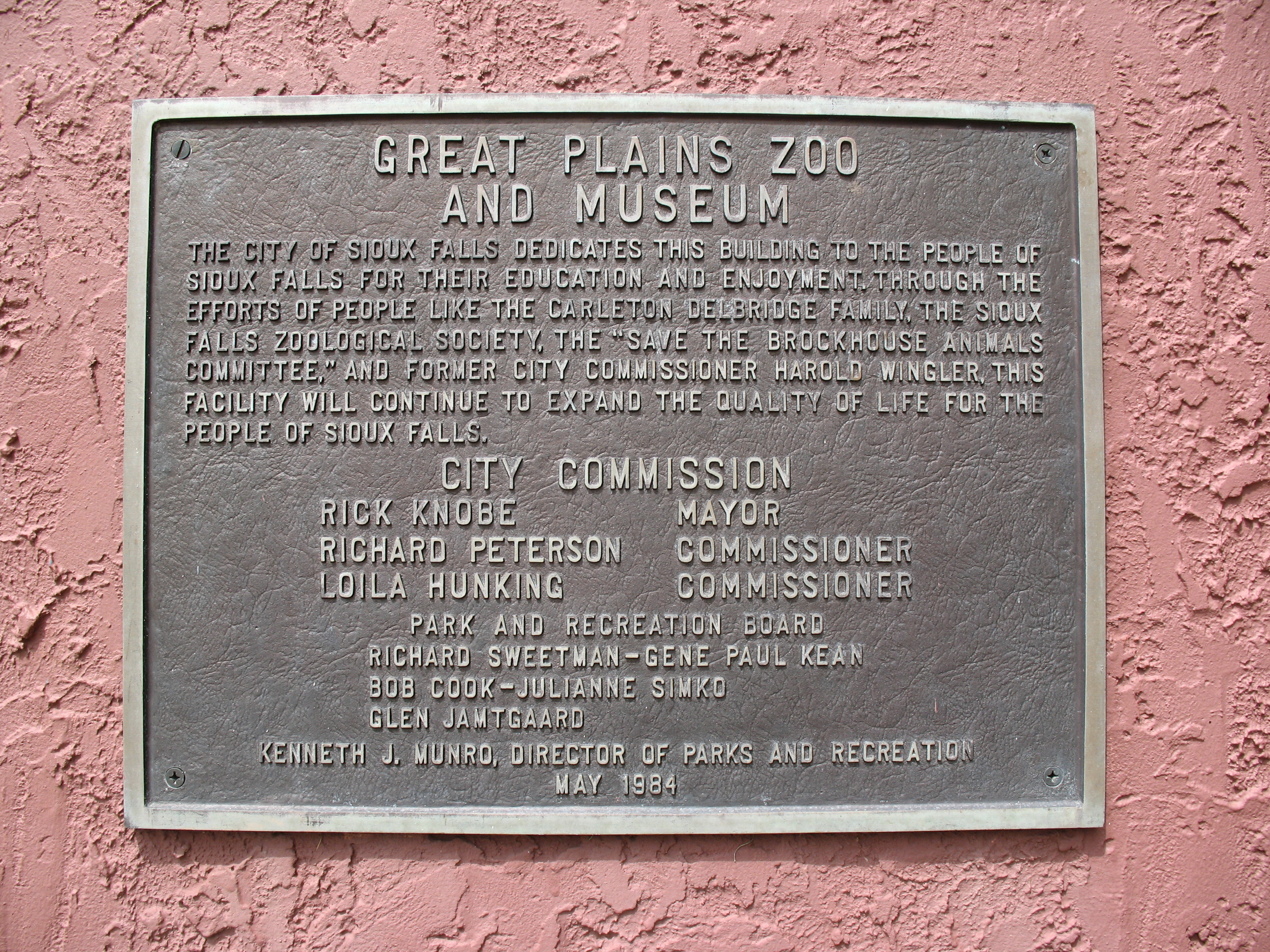
Dedication plaque on a building constructed in the 1980s.

South Dakota Senator Richard F. Pettigrew had a few animal specimens housed for viewing in local parks from the 1880s through the 1930s, when the Sioux Falls Parks System assumed responsibility and placed additional animals permanently on display in Sherman Park. The Zoological Society of Sioux Falls was established in 1957, and helped develop the Great Plains Zoo, which opened its doors to the public on June 30, 1963.

In the 1970s and 1980s, the zoo added a Children's Zoo, the Black-footed Penguin Rookery, Birds of Prey aviary, a Primate Complex, and a 10-acre (4.0 ha) North American Plains Exhibit. The Delbridge Museum of Natural History was added to the zoo in 1984 through the donation of more than 150 mounted animals from the CJ Delbridge family collection. In the 1990s, the zoo renovated several of the aging facilities, and added new habitats including the Asian cat habitat, Wild Dogs of America exhibit, the Australian Outback, Bear Canyon, and Galapagos tortoise exhibit.

By 2005 the zoo had several issues; crumbling infrastructure and financial strains left the zoo near closure. In 2005, the city appointed Elizabeth Whealy as CEO and President of the zoo in the hopes of its improvement. Whealy concluded that the zoo needed better animal care and better visitor hospitality, and decided to make some changes. In 2007, the Sioux Falls City Council approved the Great Plains Zoo's plan.

The zoo has since moved through many projects, including a renovation to the Asian Cat exhibit (2008), the Monkeys, Magic and More project (2013), among others totaling about $14 million in all. Since 2005, the zoo has doubled its animal collection (from 500 to 1,000+), rehabilitated its ponds, brought in traveling exhibits, and renovated old exhibits to house new animals.

In 2020, Elizabeth A Whealy was removed from her position due to reported working conditions, a bullying management style, and continual turnover under her direction. 'Whealy's departure comes weeks after city officials and the zoological society's board received an anonymous letter alleging Whealy had created a hostile work environment for zoo staff and used a "bullying management style.'"

The Delbridge Museum of Natural History was permanently closed in August 2023 due to detectable levels of harmful chemicals in the museum originating from its taxidermy collections. The collections are set to be deaccessioned and disposed, with most of the pieces finding their way to the Museum of Biodiversity at University of Notre Dame. In late June 2024, this zoo introduced a new African lion exhibit to the public featuring Detroit Zoo's male lion, Simba and National Zoological Park's lioness, Amahle.

== Master Plan Exhibits ==
=== Asian Cats ===
The Asian Cat exhibit was renovated in 2008 and includes panoramic views of Amur Tigers, Snow Leopards. Pallas Cats

=== Hyvee Face-to-Face Farm ===
In 2009, the former Children's Zoo was rebuilt into the Hy-Vee Face-to-Face Farm. This area features rare breeds of livestock, including San Clemente Island goats, African Pygmy goats, Nigerian Dwarf goats, Alpacas, Jacob's sheep and several breeds of Chicken.

=== Rare Rhinos of Africa ===
The Great Plains Zoo created a new exhibit for a pair of Eastern black rhinoceros in 2010. It provides a habitat and breeding facility for the zoo's rhinos. Komati permanently transferred to Disney's Animal Kingdom in 2023.

=== Japanese Macaques ===
In 2013, the zoo opened a Japanese Macaque exhibit with a renovation of the zoo's entrance, educational facilities and Chilean Flamingo exhibit. The Snow monkey exhibit features 180-degree views from covered shelters, and two water features that the Macaques have access to. In 2015, the Great Plains Zoo received Top-Honors in exhibit design for their Japanese Macaque exhibit. The zoo is, as of 2015, one of 13 zoos in the United States to care for Snow monkeys.

=== Fortress of the Bears ===
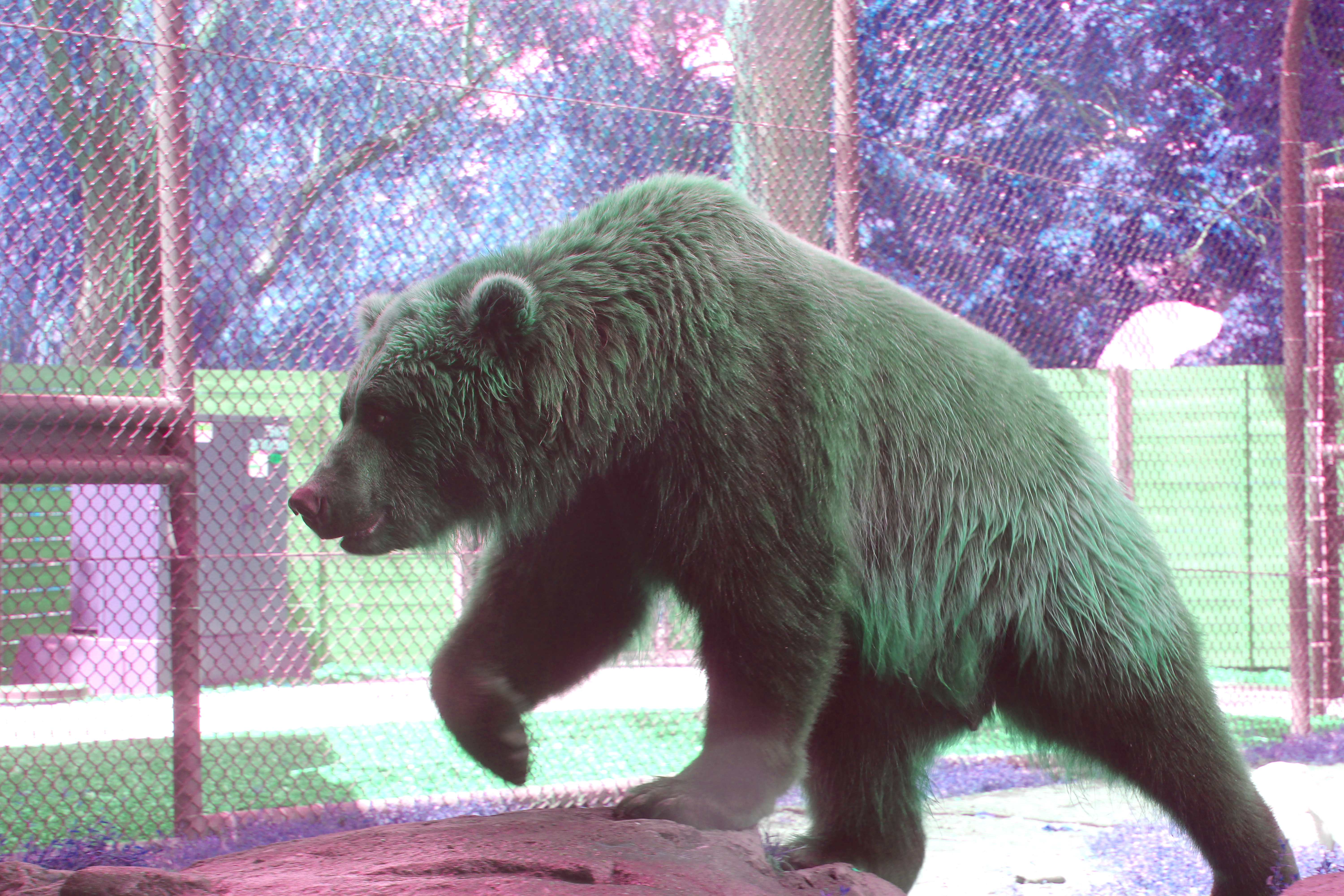
Brown bear (Ursus arctos)

In 2018, the zoo renovated the Bear Canyon habitat, one of its oldest and most popular exhibits. This exhibit is Southeastern-Alaska themed, as that is where the largest concentration of Grizzly bears in North America exists.

=== Walkabout Australia ===
In 2019, the zoo renovated several yards on its eastern and southeastern perimeter into an Australian-themed exhibit, providing renovated homes to Red and Eastern Grey Kangaroos, Bennett's Wallabies, and emus, and brings New Guinea singing dogs, Bactrian Camels, sheep in a station-themed petting enclosure, and several species of Australian birds.

== Future projects ==
As part of the zoo's current master plan, new lion, meerkat, and leopard exhibits are slated to open in the African Savannah area. The project will also include renovations to the Roar Café, the Great Plains Zoo's restaurant, providing expanded seating capacity for guests and climate-controlled views into animal exhibits. Zoo officials hope to bid on the $8 million project sometime in 2022, with construction taking 12 to 18 months.

In 2021, Great Plains Zoo CEO Rebeka Dewitz indicated that the Black Bear exhibit, located adjacent to Fortress of the Bears, would receive a renovation as part of "improving aging infrastructure at the zoo."
