= Jumilla =

- Municipality
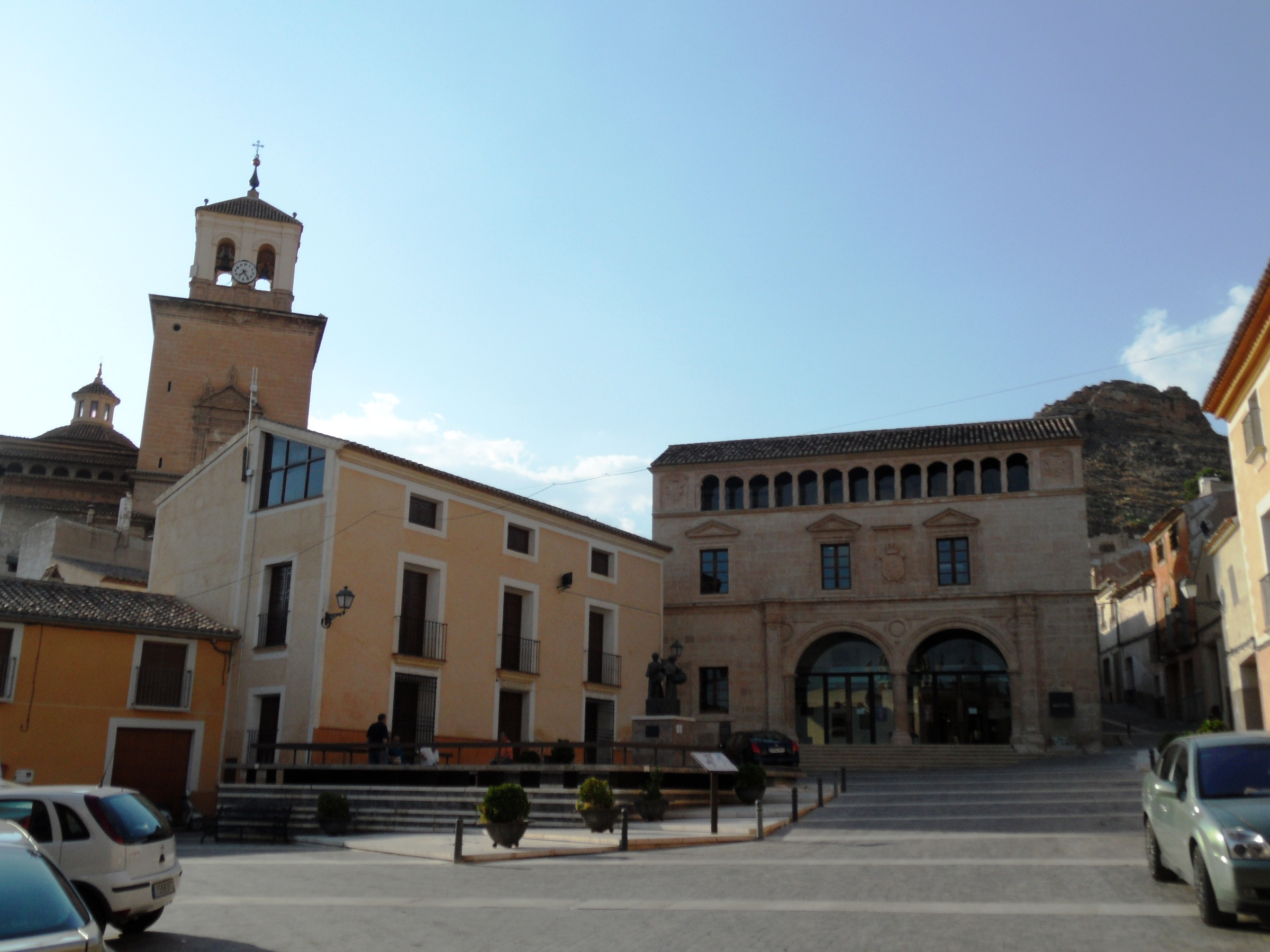

- Flag Coat of arms
- Interactive map of Jumilla
- Country: Spain
- A. community: Region of Murcia
- Province: Murcia
- Comarca: Altiplano murciano
- Judicial district: Jumilla

Government
  - Mayor: Severa González López (PP)

Area
  - Total: 972 km^{2} (375 sq mi)
- Elevation: 510 m (1,670 ft)

Population (2025-01-01)
  - Total: 27,574
  - Density: 28.4/km^{2} (73.5/sq mi)
- Demonym: Jumillanos
- Website: Official website

Jumilla (Spanish pronunciation: [xuˈmiʎa]) is a town and a municipality in southeastern Spain. It is located in the north east of the Region of Murcia, close to the towns of Cieza and Yecla. According to the 2018 census, the town population was 25,547.

Jumilla has been inhabited since the Lower Paleolithic era.

== Geography ==
The municipality, located in the north of the Region of Murcia, covers 972 square kilometres (375 mi^{2}). It shares borders with the municipality of Yecla at its northeast and its east; with Abarán, Fortuna and Cieza at its south and with Abanilla at its east. It also adjoins the province of Albacete in the autonomous community Castilla–La Mancha at its west and the province of Alicante in the autonomous community Valencian Community.

In this municipality there are several mountain landforms. There are three which are specially noteworthy in the territory and these are Sierra del Carche, Sierra del Buey and Sierra de la Pila. Other geographical elements that occupy the territory are three salt evaporation ponds. Regarding water landforms, there are not any basin with permanent water flow, but there are three ramblas or arroyos (creeks).

=== Human geography ===
The inhabitants of the municipality are distributed in the following localities: Jumilla, where 24,416 people live; La Estacada, where there are 284 residents; Fuente del Pino, which is located in the northern half and is home to 125 people; Cañada del Trigo, which is located in the southeast of Jumilla and has a population of 121; Torre del Rico, which is placed in the southeast of the municipality and is occupied by 106 residents; El Carche, which is placed in the east of the territory and occupied by 8 residents; La Alquería, with a population of 155 and Las Encebras, which is located in the southern half and is home to 45 people.

== History ==
The location of the current municipality was populated by archaic humans in the Lower Paleolithic, 450,000 years ago. Remains of human presence in the Upper and Middle Paleolithic were also discovered in the same spot dating to 80,000 BC.

There is also evidence of human presence in the Epipalaeolithic in this territory.

Chalcolithic ruins of an ancient hamlet have been found at El Prado, at a distance of 3 kilometres (1.9 mi) from the town Jumilla. This hamlet was inhabited by 300 people, and its dwellings consisted of huts formed with reed and mud adobe.

There is a cave in this current municipality which had a sacred purpose for these people 5,000 years ago. In that spot, burial sites had been discovered.

The Bronze Age (1900 BC - 900 BC in Region of Murcia) was an important period for Jumilla with a relatively large number of settlements of this era found, largely located at the bows of small hills, including Coimbra del Barrancho Ancho.

In the 3rd century BC, the Carthaginians colonised a large part of the Iberian Peninsula: from the current city of Cádiz, to the Ebro River. The Roman Republic waged war on Carthage in the Second Punic War, and won.

Consequently, Jumilla became Roman territory, and its farming lands were divided up among legionnaires. Remains of Ancient Rome in Jumilla are the Roman villa ruins. Some remarkable remains are a bronze statuette of the god Hypos and mosaics.

One surviving monument remains from the 5th century AD (Late antiquity), a paleo Christian funerary structure in the shape of a Greek cross.

In the year 711 AD, Berbers and Arabs entered the Iberian Peninsula and conquered a large portion of it. Approximately the area of the current Region of Murcia came to be under Adb's Al-Aziz power. The Abd's Al-Aziz troops circulated through Jumilla territory. The Muslims used previous built fortifications for erecting their fortress.

In the mid-13th century, the king of the Taifa of Murcia Aben Hud was menaced by the Castilian troops and by the monarch of the Emirate of Granada, Aben Almahar. The king of the Taifa of Murcia reached an agreement with the prince Alfonso X of Castile, who would be king. In this deal, issues such as respecting the inhabitants lives and possessions were agreed.

Alfonso X of Castile visited Jumilla when he was king. He ordered the construction of the Church of Santa María de Gracia, a part of which is still preserved.

After the death of Alfonso X, there were disputes for reigning. The Crown of Aragon took advantage of that situation - It declared war against the Crown of Castile and invaded the Kingdom of Murcia. Jumilla was conquered in the late 13th century or in the early 14th century. It was during the Crown of Aragon Control era when the first historic document which address solely Jumilla was written. The document was about demarcating lands and municipality with boundary markers.

In the mid-14th century, when Jumilla was under the Crown of Aragon power, this town became a border locality. Consequently, the inhabitants asked the king Peter of Castile for help in order to live in territory which belonged again to the Crown of Castile. Frederik of Castile, who was son of the king Ferdinand III of Castile, caused Jumilla to belong to the Crown of Castile again in the year 1357.

During the French invasion and the resulting Peninsular War. Jumilla's inhabitants established the military defence junta.

In 2025, the municipality banned Muslims from using public facilities to celebrate Eid al-Fitr and Eid al-Adha. The ban in Jumilla is a first in Spain.

== Municipal Government ==
Jumilla City Council
| Party | Councillor | Responsibilities |
|---|---|---|
| PP | Seve González López | Mayor Urbanism, Employment and Local Development |
| PP | María del Carmen Cruz Vicente | Speaker of the Council Social Policy, Education, Equality, Consumption, Community Dynamization and Youth |
| PP | Antonio Pérez Gómez | Environment, Activities, Agriculture and Forests |
| PP | Asunción Navarro Miralles | Culture, Tourism, Celebrations and Old Town |
| PP | Delfín Blázquez Burruezo | Finance, Personnel, Internal Regime, Transparency and Innovation |
| PP | Raquel Ruescas Carmona | Citizen Security, Traffic, Road Safety, Emergencies and Civil Protection |
| PP | Francisco Javier Bernal Lover | Services, Public Roads and Cemetery |
| PP | María Herrero Jiménez | Sports, Animal Welfare and Municipal Broadcaster |
| PP | Álvaro Soriano Ferri | Youth, Transparency and Innovation |
| PP | Francisca Simón González | Commerce, Crafts, Hospitality, Markets, Pedanías and Citizen Participation |
| PSOE | Juana Guardiola Verdú | Deputy Speaker of the Council |
| PSOE | Juan Gil Mira | |
| PSOE | Pilar Martínez Monreal | |
| PSOE | Francisco González González | |
| PSOE | Juan Antonio González Gomariz | |
| PSOE | Sinforosa Sánchez Vergara | |
| PSOE | Juan Marcos Cahigüela Martínez | |
| PSOE | Eugenio Aguado Guardiola | |
| PSOE | Isabel María López Abellán | |
| Mixed - Vox | Juan Agustín Carrillo Navarro | |
| Mixed - IU-Podemos-AV | Ana López Martínez | |

== Economy ==
Jumilla's economy is based on agriculture with main cultivation being vineyards, olive trees and fruit trees.

Jumilla is home to a large photovoltaic solar power farm, with an installed peak power capacity of 20 megawatts. The solar farm consists of 120,000 solar panels and covers 100 hectares (247 acres). The farm's total annual production will be the equivalent of the energy used by 20,000 homes. The solar panels are owned by groups of investors. It is expected to generate an estimated annual income of $28 million (€19 million) and a reduction in carbon dioxide emissions of 42,000 tons a year. Powerlight provided single-axis solar trackers to improve the system's performance.

Jumilla, together with neighboring Yecla, is one of the primary regions for development of the Murciana and Granadina breeds of dairy goats. Jumilla is also a wine-producing region famous for its Carta Roja wines. Jumilla's wine production and culture are particularly notable for its use of the Monastrell grape as a varietal.

== Main sights ==
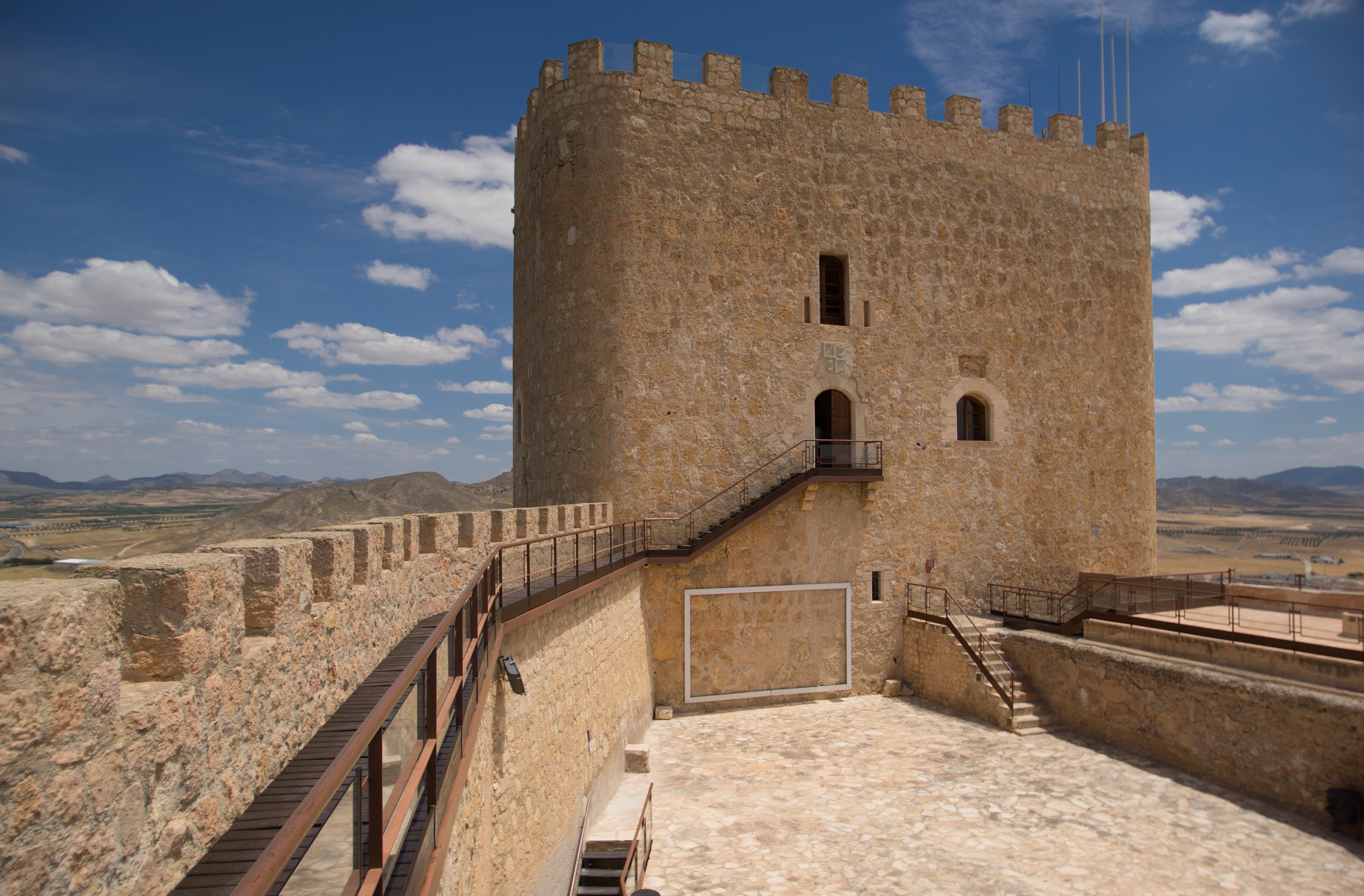
The main tower of Jumilla's castle.

Some buildings that have special culture values such as historic or artistic are shown below:

- El Casón: This is a funerary vault which estimated date of its building is the 5th century AD.
- Jumilla's castle: The hill where the castle is built was inhabited by people from the Bronze Age. In a later era, this was occupied by people when Iberian civilizations were present in large part of Iberian Peninsula, and specifically in the current municipality. In Roman Iberian Peninsula period, people also leveraged this hill. The last era in regards to this hill before the construction of the current castle is the one when large part of Iberian Peninsula was under Muslim peoples rule. They built a fortress in the 8th century, but they used unstable materials. The current castle was built in the year 1461 and its architectural style is gothic.
- Cuco de la Alberquilla/ Cuco de Zacarías
- Santa María del Rosario Church: It was built on a Muslim cemetery in the first half of the 15th century, and it is placed in the town end.
- Palacio del Antiguo Concejo
- San Agustín Church: It is placed in the town end, and locals conceive it as a border demarcator in regards to the town and the countryside. It was erected in the year 1570 and restored in the late-18th century. It has a rectangular plan, one nave, some side chapels, and a small crossing. Two domes are present in the building – one roofs the crossing and the other roofs the altar.
- Santa Ana del Monte Convent: This was built in the year 1573.
- San Roque Arch
- San José Church: This was built in the late 17th century. Its architectural style is baroque with local features of Region of Murcia.
- San Antón Church: This was formed in 1611 and is placed in the town end. It has a Greek cross plan. The building was restored in 2002. Currently, it serves as a museum for Holy Week issues.
- Vico Theatre: This building was constructed in the late 19th century and its architectural style is eclectic.
- Modernist building: It was built in the year 1911.

== Festivities ==
The festivities held in the municipality are shown below:

- Holy Week
- Wine grapes harvesting festivity: this event takes place in August, and it coincides with the patron saint festivity.
- Patron saint festivity: It is held in August. It usually starts on the second week and lasts 10 or 11 days.
- Moros y cristianos: it also occurs in August.
- Jumilla Town National Festival of Folklore

== See also ==
- Torta de gazpacho
- Spanish wine
- List of municipalities in the Region of Murcia
