= American Goat Society =

The American Goat Society or AGS is a United States corporation located in Pipe Creek, Texas and run by the Kowalik family. The corporation was founded in New York City in 1935 by goat breeders and dedicated to preserving and improving the pedigrees and production records of purebred dairy goats.

Originally a nonprofit organization, AGS lost its exempt status in 2013 for failure to file a form 990 with the IRS for three years. The organization still maintains a board of directors.

== History ==
The year after it was formed, the AGS merged with the International Milk Goat Record Association (IMGRA), which had previously formed in 1925, and thus some of its pedigrees go back more than 80 years. It was the first organization to bring a national goat show and to provide training for goat show judges.

The mission of AGS is to promote the breeding and improvement of the Purebred Dairy Goat; to disseminate information on goat milk and its by-products; and to establish, maintain and publish pedigrees and other records.

== Breed registry ==
The American Goat Society was the first registry to require exclusively purebred goats and to provide two generations of pedigree on the registry certificate. Unlike some other goat registries, such as the American Dairy Goat Association, the AGS does not allow goats to achieve purebred status by breeding and thus does not offer any registration for mixed-breeds, experimental breeds, or non-pedigreed 'grade' goats.

== Services offered ==
The American Goat Society offers membership, registration of animals, DHI testing, show sanctioning for individual animals, and show judge training.
