= Murciana goat =

Breed of goat

Murciana, also called Murcian, Murcien, Murciene and Royal Murciana is a dual-purpose (for both milk and meat) breed of goat originally bred in the Murcia province along the Mediterranean coast of southeastern Spain. The main milk-producing goat breed in Spain is a cross between the Murciana and the Granadina goat known as Murciano-granadina goat. Only the latter is officially recognized by the Spanish government, so Murciana goats are considered a variety of such breed.

== Breed characteristics ==
While it is shorter-eared than many goats, the Murciana's ear is shaped like those of the Swiss breeds, such as Alpines, Oberhaslis, and Saanens, and carried horizontally. They are renowned for producing high-quality milk that is exceptionally butterfat-rich. Goats from the Murcia and Malta breeds, including the Murciana, are more likely to breed out of season than are goats of the French Alpine and related breeds, due to concerted breeding efforts to culture this tendency, which may allow year-round freshening and milking. This breed may have actually originated in Africa.

== Primary regions ==
Primary Murciana goat farming areas are in the region of Murcia, in the communities of Jumilla and Yecla.

== History ==
By the early 16th century, Murciana goats were well established in Spain, as were several other Spanish breeds, including the Malaguena goat, the La Blanca Celtibora goat, and the La Castellana Extremena goat, due to breeding policies set by Spain's long-established Sheepmaster's Guild. Display ads in The Goat World of the time indicate the Murciana goats were in the U.S. by 1920, referred to as the "Royal Murciana." Dr. C. P. DeLangle, in his article The Murcien Goat, printed in the August 1921 issue of The Goat World wrote of them, "The Murcien goat is one, if not the handsomest goats known." By 1936, the Murcianas may have become scarce in the U.S., as the January issue of the Dairy Goat Journal called for help to re-establish the breed, noting there did not seem to be a pure-bred buck in America, and that a Mrs. Katherine Kadel had the only purebred does at that time. The same article also noted a reliable supply of Murcianas could be found in Mexico, in a herd imported from Spain that also contained Granada goats.

== Bloodlines ==
The breed forms part of the ancestral bloodline of the American Lamancha goat, originally bred in the 1930s by Mrs. Eula Fay Frey of Glide, Oregon, in the United States. The registered Murciana whose bloodline ran through Mrs. Frey's herd was owned by a Mr. and Mrs. Harry Gordon and her primary foundational buck was a bright red Murciana-Nubian cross named Christopher.

The long-isolated feral goats of the Channel Islands, off the coast of California, such as the San Clemente Island goat and the Santa Catalina Island goat, are thought to be descended from goats brought to the island by Spanish missionaries and settlers, including La Blanca Celtiboras, La Castellana Extremenas, and later the more common dairy and meat goats of Spain, the Malaguenas and Murcianas.

== Organizations ==
There exists in Spain an organization called Asociación Española de Criadores de Cabras de Raza Murciano-Granadina (ACRIMUR); the Spanish National Association of the Murciana-Granadina Goat.
