= Murciano-Granadina =

Breed of goat

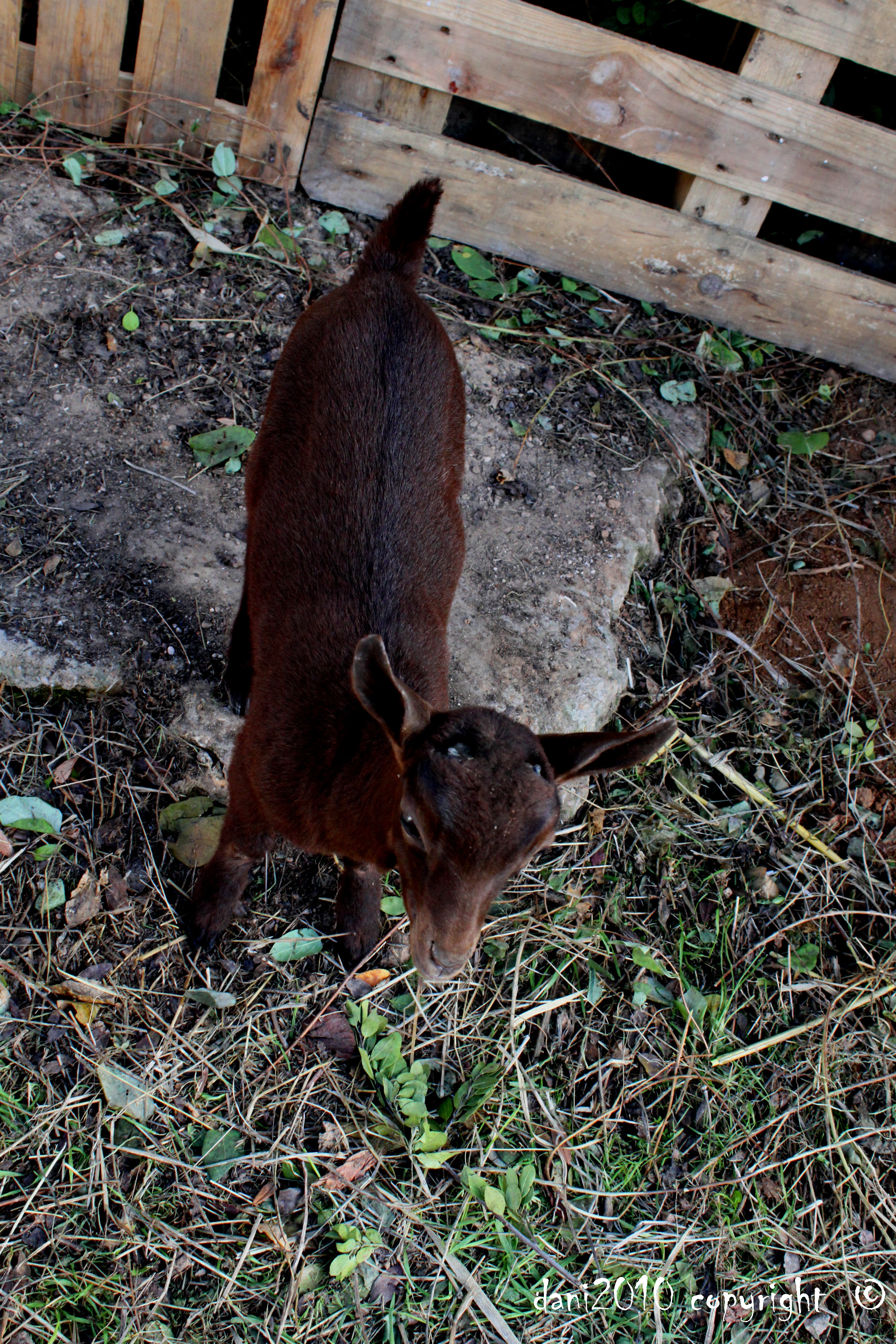
- Two-month-old kid
- Conservation status: FAO (2007): not a risk
- Other names: Murcia-Granada; Murciana-Granadina
- Country of origin: Spain
- Distribution: Granada; Levante
- Use: dairy

Traits
- Weight: Male: 67 kg; Female: 50 kg
- Height: Male: 77 cm; Female: 70 cm
- Goat; Capra aegagrus hircus

The Murciano-Granadina is a Spanish breed of dairy goat. It was created in 1975 when two existing breeds, the mahogany-coloured Murciana of Murcia and the black Granadina of Granada, began to be hybridised as a result of the official recognition of a single flock-book including both breeds. It is the most important dairy goat breed of Spain, with more than 500,000 milking females. It originated in the semi arid areas in south eastern Spain, including parts of Murcia, Almería, Granada and Alicante. They were bred for two main traits, milk production and its ability to continue this production in dry and nutrient poor regions. They have been introduced into several areas in Latin America as well as northern Africa.

== Characteristics ==
These goats are medium size for goats, around 30 to 50 kg for females and 50–60 kg for males. They are solid colored, usually black or mahogany colored. The breed association, ACRIMUR (Asociación Española de Criadores de la Cabra Murciano-Granadina, or Spanish Association of Breeders of the Murcia-Granada Goat) states that they refuse to accept any goat that had white hair even in the smallest amount as M-G. The goats have erect ears and tails, with a short, coarse coat, though it is longer in males than in females. Genotyping of various goat breeds from southern Spain revealed that the Murciano-Granadina breed is significantly closer to the Murciana breed than any other, including the Granadina.

These goats are very good milk producers, with a lactation period of around 210 days, often producing 500 kg of milk annually, with some individuals producing as much as twice that. Their milk has 5.6% fat, and 3.6% protein, which is better than most other goat breeds in Mediterranean Europe. In Spain this milk is primarily used for cheese production. They are also used for meat, especially due to the rapid development of their kids. The growth of Murcia-Granada kids can be improved by crossing females of this breed with a meat breed (Boer goats)

These goats reproduce quickly, since they do not have a particular season for breeding, and the females can come into heat at any time of the year. Usually two kids are born per breeding, and they become sexually mature around 7 to 8 months of age.

== See also ==
- Murciana goat
- Granadina goat
