= Alpine (American goat breed) =

North American breed of goat

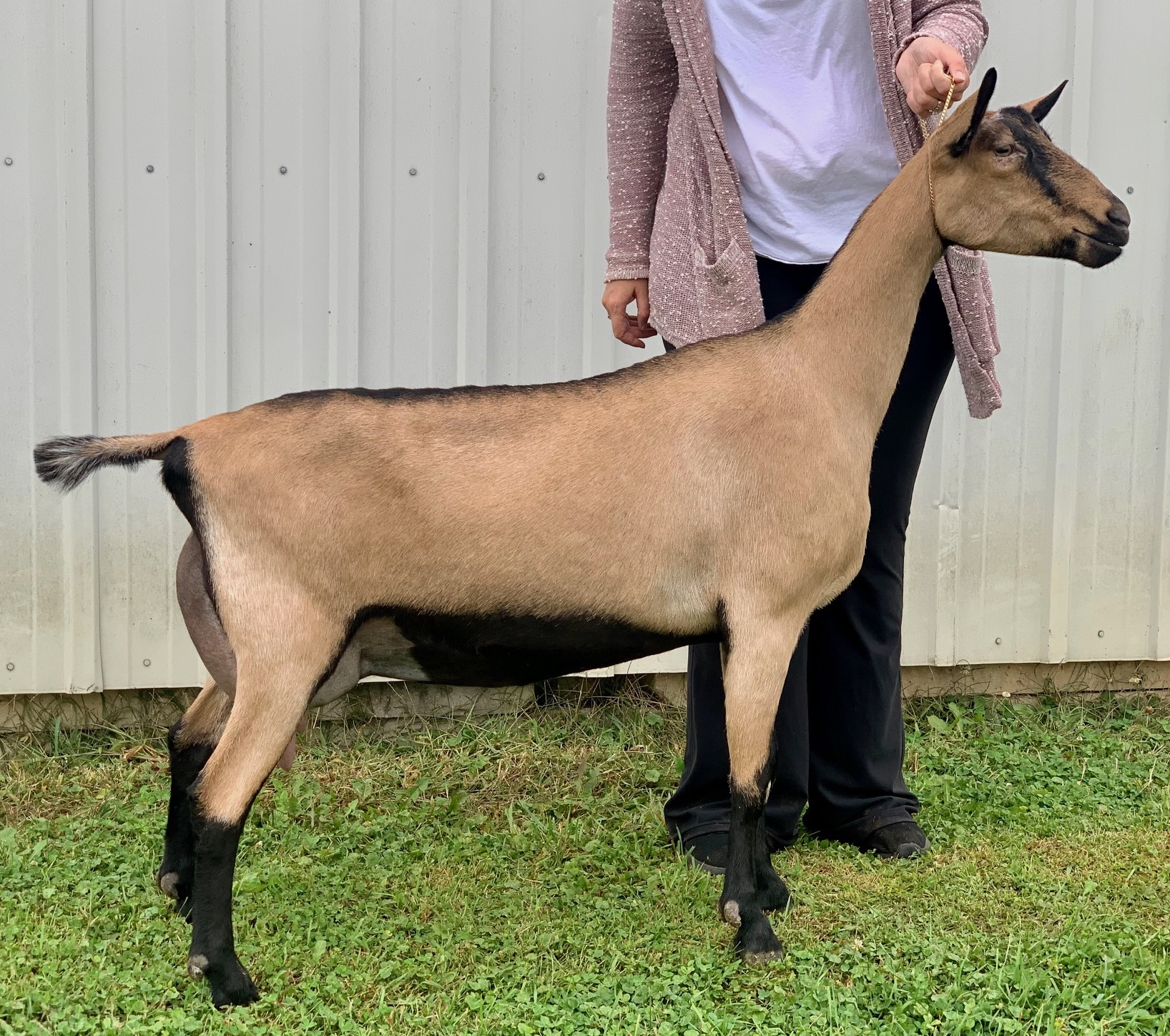
- Doe with chamoisée coloration

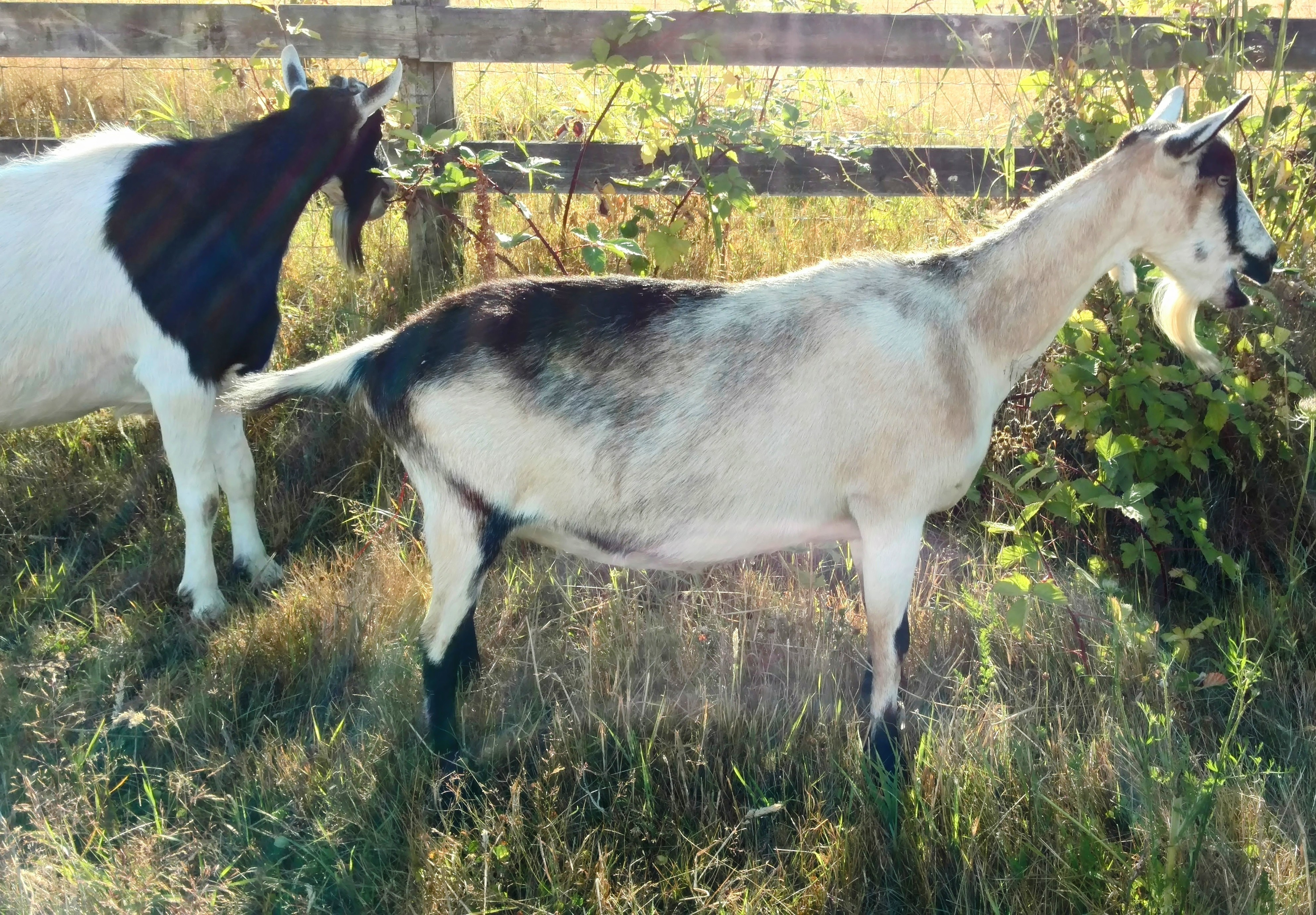
- Doe with cou claire coloration and black and white wether in background
- Conservation status: DAD-IS (USA, 2026): at risk/vulnerable; DAD-IS (Canada, 2026: at risk/endangered
- Other names: Alpine polychrome; American Alpine; French Alpine
- Country of origin: Canada; United States
- Distribution: France; Italy; Switzerland
- Use: dairy, crossbreeding

Traits
- Weight: Male: over 170 lb (77 kg); Female: over 135 lb (61 kg)
- Height: Male: over 32 in (810 mm); Female: over 30 in (760 mm)
- Skin color: variable
- Face color: variable
- Horn status: horned or polled
- Beard: bearded
- Goat; Capra aegagrus hircus

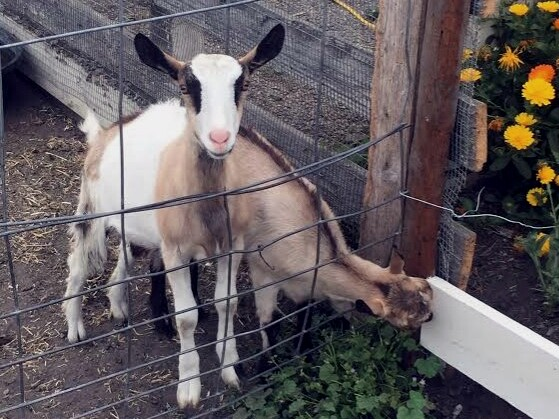
Kids

The Alpine is a North American breed of medium- to large-sized domestic goat of dairy type. It may be horned or polled and has a straight facial profile and erect ears; various coloration patterns are accepted, others are disallowed.

It derives from French dairy goats and other breeds including the British Alpine imported from Europe. Mature goats should weigh at least 135 lb (61 kg), and stand over 30 in (760 mm) at the withers.

Under American Dairy Goat Association (ADGA) rules, the term "French Alpine" only refers to purebred animals tracing back to the original establishment of the breed. Animals that are less than 100% but greater than 75% are called "American Alpines".

== History ==
The Alpine derives from stock of several types of dairy goats from the French Alps as well as other goat breeds – including the British Alpine – imported from Europe. Swiss Alpines are now recognized as a separate breed known as Oberhasli.

== Characteristics ==
The Alpine is a medium- to large-sized breed: mature goats should weigh at least 135 lb (61 kg), and stand over 30 in (760 mm) tall at the withers. Males stand over 32 in (810 mm) and females over 30 in (760 mm). The hair is short to medium in length; various coloration patterns are accepted, others are disallowed. The ears are erect ears and the facial profile straight. It is hardy and adaptable to a variety of climates. It is the only breed with erect ears that comes in all colors and combinations of colors.

The goats become sexually mature at four to five months for buck kids and five to six months for does. The gestation period lasts for 145–155 days, with an average of 150. The number of kids varies from one to five; twin births are the most common.

Alpine goats typically possess a highly curious and friendly temperament but are notably stubborn.

The American Dairy Goat Association faults all-white and Toggenburg-patterned individuals.

== Use ==
The Alpine goat is, with the Saanen and the Toggenburg, one of the most productive dairy goats. The milk has an average milkfat content of 3.4%; the Nubian gives a lower volume of milk but with higher butterfat content. The milk is higher in sugars than cows' milk but lower in protein, with an average of 2.3 g per 250 ml compared to 3.4 g for cow’s milk. The overall nutritional profile is slightly higher than that of Saanen milk. The milk can be made into butter, cheese, soap, ice cream or any other dairy product normally made from cow's milk.

The peak period for milk production occurs four to six weeks after parturition (kidding). The optimal weight at which a goat produces optimal milk production is at least 130 pounds. For the Alpine goat that number is higher at 135 pounds and produces an average of 2,134 pounds of milk per lactation.
