= Boer goat =

South African breed of goat

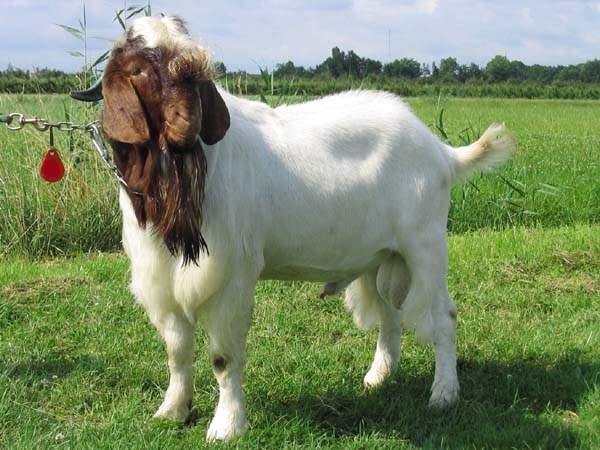
- Conservation status: FAO (2007): not at risk; DAD-IS (2025): not at risk
- Other names: Boerbok; Improved Boer; Veredelde Boerbok
- Country of origin: South Africa
- Distribution: international
- Standard: SA Boer Goat Breeders' Association
- Use: meat

Traits
- Weight: Male: average 114 kg (250 lb); Female: average 94 kg (205 lb)
- Height: Male: average 94 cm (37 in); Female: average 78 cm (31 in)
- Horn status: horned in both sexes
- Tassels: no
- Goat; Capra aegagrus hircus

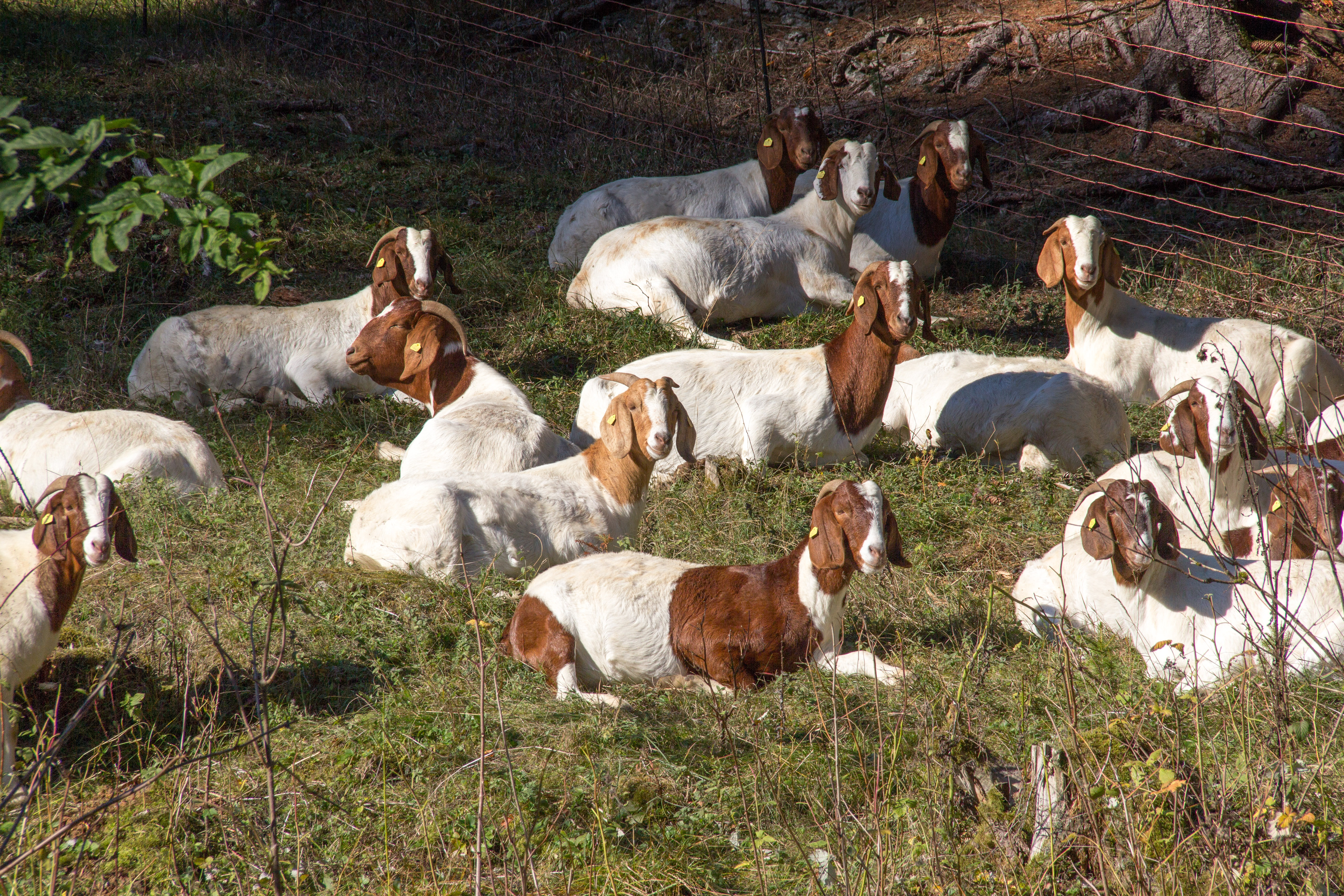
Variations in coat colour

The Boer or Boerbok is a South African breed of meat goat. It was selectively bred in the Eastern Cape from about 1920 for meat qualities and for the ability to survive by grazing on the thorn veldt of that region. It has been exported to many countries, and has been used to improve the meat qualities of other breeds.

== History ==
Europeans arriving in the Cape in the seventeenth century found an established population of goats kept by Khoikhoi peoples. These were small, with short speckled coats; it was thought that they had been brought to the area by peoples migrating southwards down the eastern coast of Africa. In following centuries, goats kept by Boer farmers in the Eastern Cape were derived from stock acquired from Khoikhoi and Bantu peoples, possibly with some influence from the Angora or from European or Indian stock. A variety of types and colours was described in the 1830s; by the end of the century the Boer was a large and powerful goat with a convex profile and lop ears, bearing some resemblance to the Anglo-Nubian. A census in the Cape Colony in 1891 found 3444019 head.

Selective breeding for specific qualities began in about 1930, initially for foraging ability and for meat quantity and quality, later also for coat colour – specifically for the white body with red-brown head that now characterises the breed.

A breed society, the Boer Goat Breeders' Association or Boerbok Telersvereniging, was started in Somerset East in 1959.

The Boer has been exported to many countries of the world, in all five inhabited continents. In 2025 it was reported to DAD-IS by 72 countries, of which 30 reported population data; populations of 5000 or more were reported by Argentina, Australia, Brazil, Chile, Colombia, Namibia and South Africa; the total population world-wide was estimated at 182863.

== Characteristics ==
The Boer is a large goat: the average weight of an adult male is some 115 kg, with a mean height reported in 1984 at over 94 cm. The coat is glossy and short; the recommended colouring is white with a reddish-brown head with a white blaze, and pigmented skin. The ears and horns are of medium size; the ears are broad, pendulous and smooth, the horns dark in colour, backward-curving, round and solid.

It is well adapted to grazing on a wide variety of local biomes, including sourveld, coastal veld, mixed veld and thornveld. It has a fast growth rate and good carcass qualities, good resistance to disease and good adaptation to hot, dry semi-desert conditions.

The ewes are polyoestrous and are capable of breeding at any time of year; the natural breeding season is in April and May (i.e., in autumn in the Southern Hemisphere), and breeding activity is at its lowest in late spring and early summer, or approximately November to January. The oestrous cycle lasts approximately 21 days, the oestrus some 30–45 hours. The average gestation period is approximately 148 days, and the anoestrous post-partum period varies from some 30 to 80 days; conception is usually confirmed between 42 and 82 days after parturition.

The age of puberty in ewe kids depends on the season of their birth, varying from a mean of about 157 days for those born in mid-summer (January) – and thus weaned in the natural autumn (April/May) breeding season – to about 191 days for those born in late winter (August). Weights at puberty are roughly in the range 24–32 kg with a mean of about 28 kg for ewes receiving a low-energy diet, and 24–38 kg with mean of about 31 kg for those on a higher-energy regime.

Ewes can be managed so that they give birth three times in every two years. Single, twin, triplet and quadruplet births occur in the ratio 25:59:15:1.

== Use ==
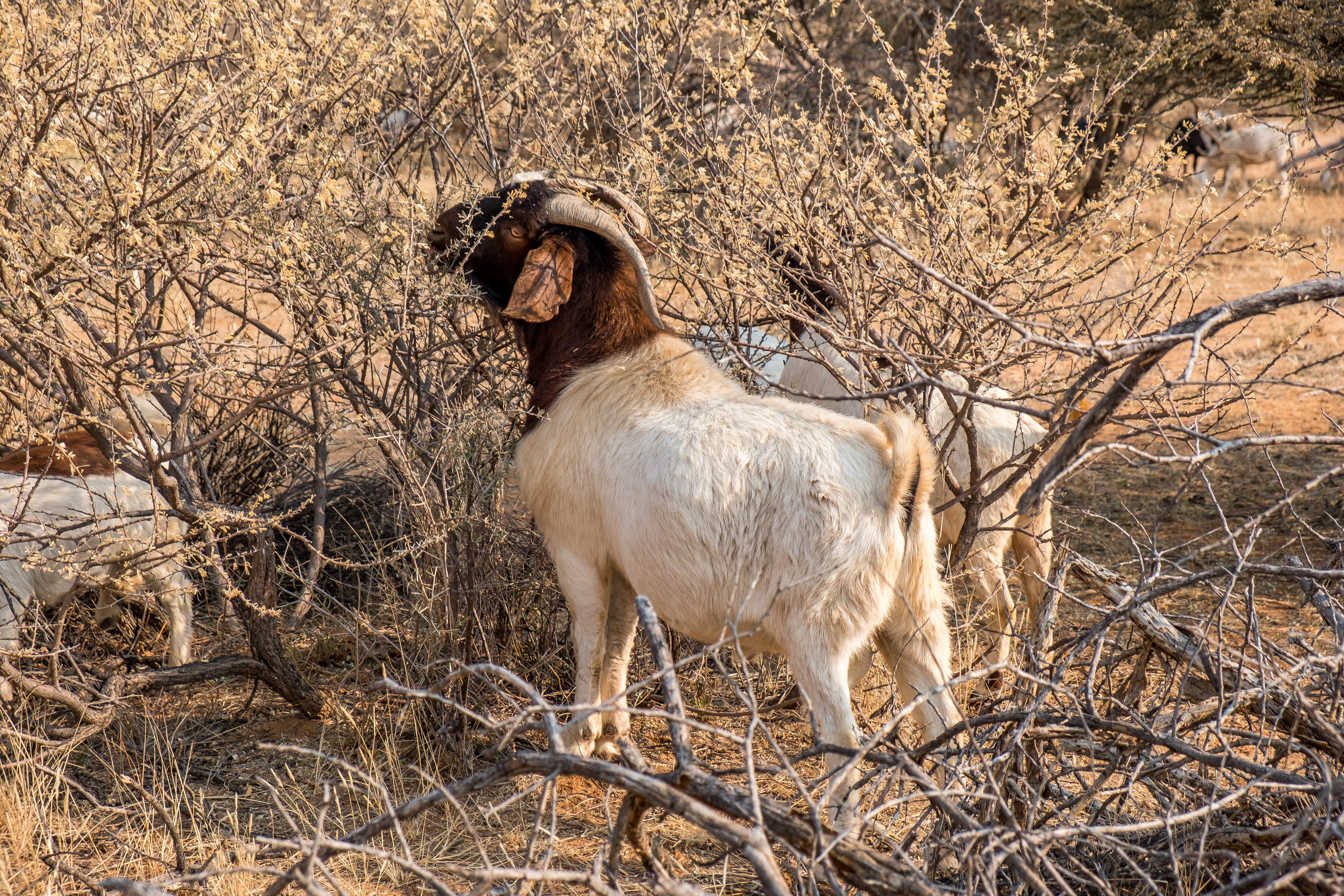
Browsing on shrubs in Namibia

The Boer is a meat breed, and is reared principally for that reason. Under extensive management in the sub-tropics, a weight gain of approximately 175 g per day may be expected; daily gains of more than 200 g are possible under intensive conditions. The goats are able to exploit low-quality scrubland, grazing on thorn trees, bushes and shrubs; they may be used in vegetation management, and are kept for this purpose in some areas of thornveld.

The milk yield of ewes is some 1.5–2.5 kg per day, with about 7.7% fat and 4.3% protein.
