= Granadina goat =

Breed of goat

Granadina is a Spanish breed of goat. It is one of the oldest livestock breeds of Spain, being mentioned in 15th century sources. Its milk-producing characteristics were documented in 1893 and it was officially recognized in 1933. However, since 1975, it is considered a variety of the Murciano-Granadina goat, which is a cross between the Murciana goat and the Granadina goat. Only the Murciano-Granadina breed is officially recognized by the Government of Spain. Murciano-Granadina goats have become the primary milk-producing goat breed in Spain, while the Granadina variety is rare. Its first germplasm bank was created in 2010 to combat its loss of genetic diversity.
