= San Clemente Island goat =

Breed of goat

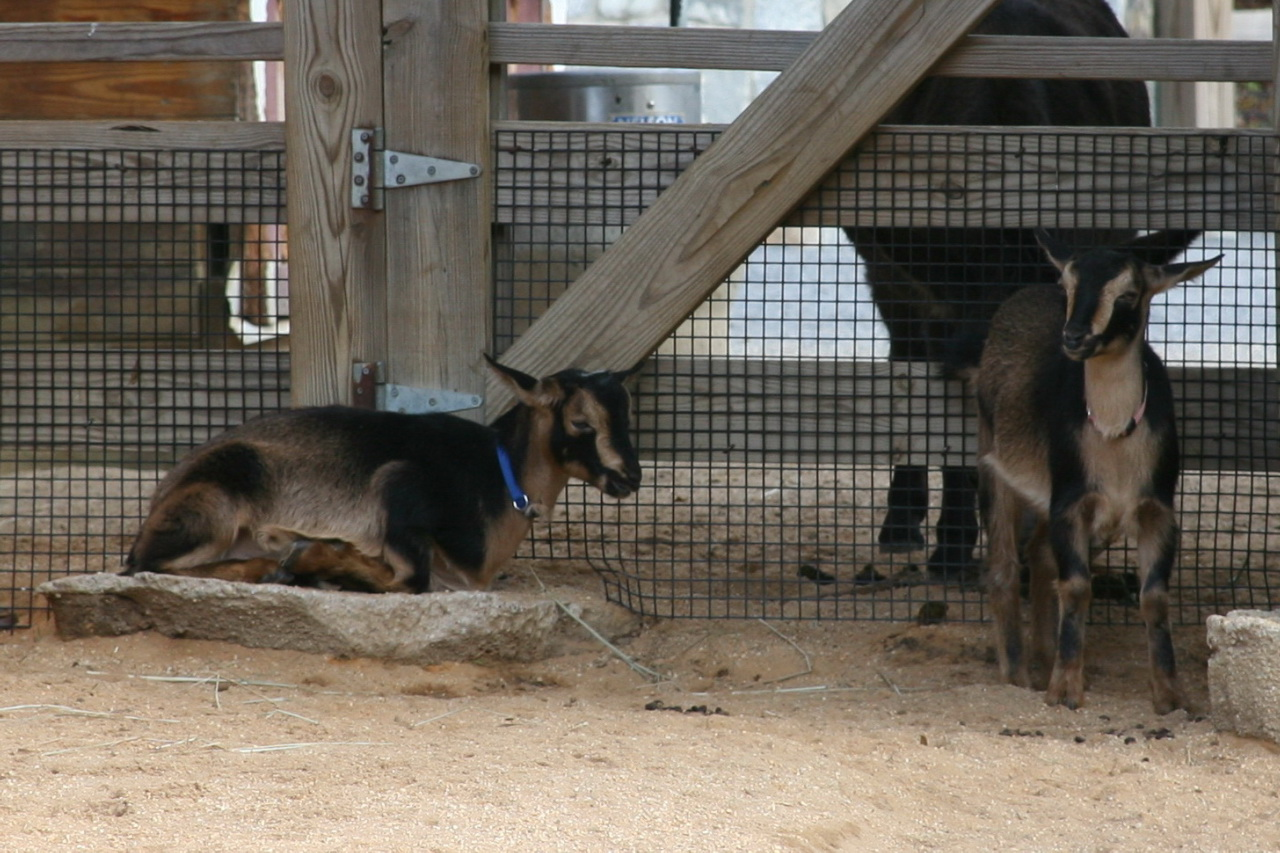
San Clemente goat kids at the National Zoo in Washington, D.C.

The San Clemente Island goat is a type of domestic goat derived from feral goats isolated on San Clemente Island, one of the Channel Islands of California.

== History ==
The long-isolated feral goats of the Channel Islands, including the San Clemente Island goat and the Santa Catalina Island goat are thought to be descendants of goats brought to the islands by Spanish missionaries and settlers; breeds such as la Blanca Celtiboras, la Castellana Extremenas, and later the more common dairy and meat goats of Spain, the Malaguenas and Murciana goats. They first arrived on San Clemente from Santa Catalina Island, in 1875, and there they remained feral until the United States Navy, which was under a directive to preserve the endangered flora and fauna of the island that were threatened by the grazing of nonendemic species, sought their removal. After initial trapping and hunting failed to eliminate the goats, the Navy began a shooting program to exterminate them. This was blocked in court by the Fund for Animals, which asserted the goats did not hurt any endangered species, and thought the Navy was using this claim as an excuse. This was incorrect, as the threatened and endangered species of plants were already federally listed and protected by the Endangered Species Act.

Goats were put up for adoption on the mainland by the Clapp family and by the Fund for Animals. The U.S. Navy was given the right to exterminate the remaining goats, and the last goat on San Clemente Island was killed in April, 1991.

== Characteristics ==
San Clemente Island goats are small, fine-boned, and deer-like. The males sport outwardly twisting, "Spanish-type" horns. Both sexes are horned and although their large horns resemble those of Spanish goats, San Clemente goats are not of Spanish origin. The Livestock Conservancy (formerly ALBC) with the University of Cordoba in Spain conducted a DNA study of the breed in 2007 and found that the San Clemente goat is a genetically distinct breed and unrelated to the numerous other breeds in the study. San Clemente Island goats are listed as a critically endangered heritage breed on the Conservation Priority List by the Livestock Conservancy. In 2020, their global population was about 1400. They live on the mainland U.S.A. and in Canada.
