= Anglo-Nubian =

British breed of goat

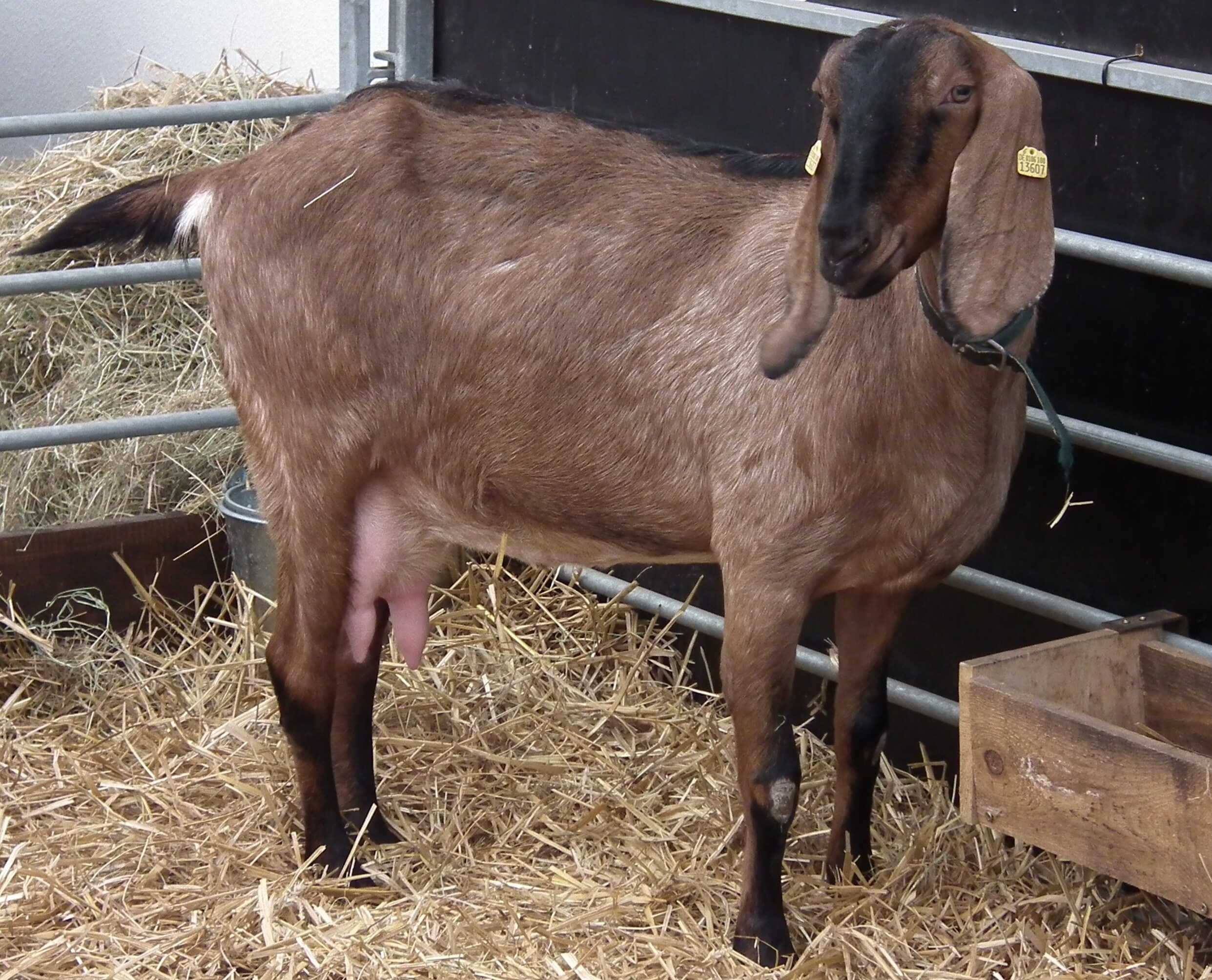
- Doe in milk
- Conservation status: FAO (2007): not at risk; DAD-IS (2022): not at risk (world-wide); DAD-IS (2022): endangered (UK)
- Other names: Nubian
- Country of origin: United Kingdom
- Distribution: more than sixty countries
- Use: dual-purpose, meat and dairy

Traits
- Weight: Male: up to: 140 kg (310 lb); Female: up to: 110 kg (240 lb)
- Height: Male: average: 90 cm (35 in); Female: average: 80 cm (31 in)
- Coat: variable: usually black, chestnut, cream, fawn or white, often patterned
- Horn status: either polled or with small horns
- Goat; Capra aegagrus hircus

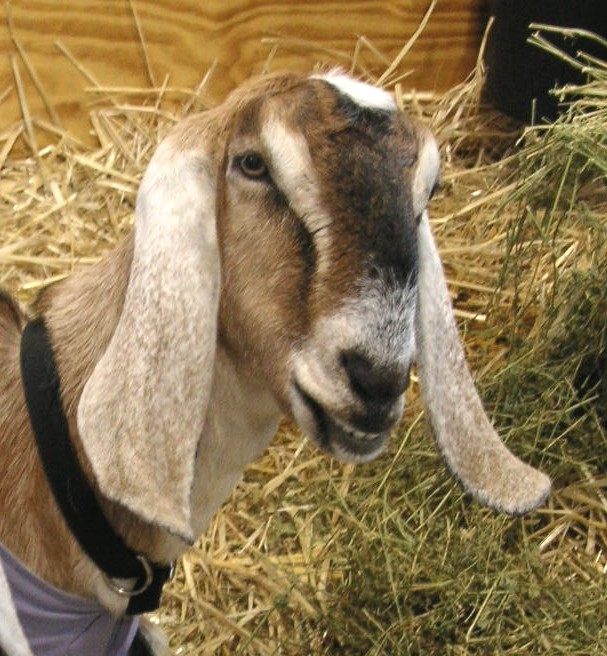
The Anglo-Nubian is characterised by large, pendulous ears and a convex profile.

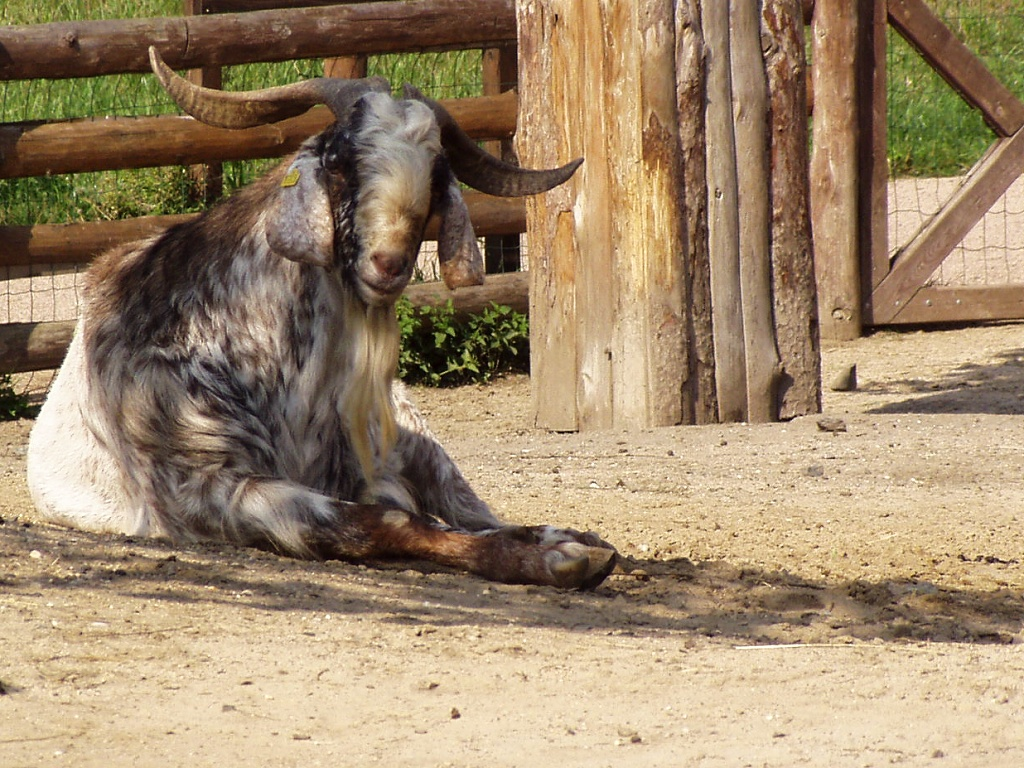
Buck

The Anglo-Nubian is a British breed of domestic goat. It originated in the nineteenth century from cross-breeding between native British goats and a mixed population of large lop-eared goats imported from India, the Middle East and North Africa. It is characterised by large, pendulous ears and a convex profile. It has been exported to many parts of the world, and is found in more than sixty countries. In many of them it is known simply as the Nubian.

== History ==
The Anglo-Nubian breed originated in the British Isles in the nineteenth century from cross-breeding between traditional native prick-eared British goats and a mixed population of large lop-eared goats imported from India, the Middle East and North Africa. Many of these were brought to British shores by steamers of the P & O Steamship Company, which routinely loaded goats on board before starting a homeward voyage from the Orient, so as to have milk and fresh meat available during the voyage. Some of these goats were commonly off-loaded and sold when the ships docked; regardless of their actual place or port of origin, they were often referred to as "Nubians" in the later nineteenth century. Among them were examples of the Egyptian Zaraibi, which significantly influenced the development of the Anglo-Nubian.

Three bucks were particularly influential on the breed: an Indian Jamnapari imported in 1896; another Indian goat, this from Chitral; and a Zaraibi imported at about the same time. The first registrations in the herd-book were in 1910, and no further use was made of imported breeding stock thereafter.

Some were exported to the West Indies in the early twentieth century, and from there some entered the United States, where the first arrivals were in 1909. Others were exported to Brazil.

In 2017 the Anglo-Nubian was reported under various names from more than sixty countries of the world. Its conservation status at world level was listed by the FAO as "not at risk" in 2007, and was reported to DAD-IS as "not at risk" in 2020. In the United Kingdom its status in 2020 was "endangered", but it was not among the goat breeds on the goat watchlist of the Rare Breeds Survival Trust.

== Characteristics ==
The Anglo-Nubian is a large goat, characterised by long legs, a markedly convex facial profile, and long pendulous lop ears. The head is carried high; it may either be polled or have small downward-curved horns. In does the coat is short and smooth, in bucks it is somewhat rougher and longer. The coat may be of any of a wide range of colours, either solid or in various marbled or mottled patterns; among the most frequent are white, cream, fawn, chestnut and black.

== Use ==
The Anglo-Nubian is a dual-purpose goat, reared both for goat's meat and for milk. Kids fatten quickly for meat production. The milk yield is not as high as in some Swiss goat breeds, but the milk has a higher percentage of fat. Does give approximately 3.9 kg of milk per day, with an average fat content of about 4.8%. The highest recorded 24-hour yield is some 8.25 kg, while the highest authenticated annual yield is over 2500 kg.
