= List of North American goat breeds =

This is a list of goat breeds present or previously existing in North America. The goat is not indigenous to North America, so none of them are exclusively American. Some were developed locally from existing breeds, while others were direct imports.

Name	Origin	Notes	Image
Alpine	France, United Kingdom		
American Lamancha	Mexico, Spain		
American Pygmy	West Africa		
Angora	Turkey		
Boer	South Africa		
Cashmere	Australia, New Zealand, Spain	Cashmere goats in the United States are not considered a formal breed, and any animal meeting the desired type may be registered with NACG.	
Kalahari Red	South Africa		
Kiko	New Zealand		
Kinder	United States	Crossbred between Nubians and Pygmies	
Myotonic	United States, Canada		
Nigerian Dwarf	West Africa		
Nubian	United Kingdom (originally India, Africa, and the Mediterranean)		
Oberhasli	Switzerland	Also known as "Swiss Alpine"	
Pygora	United States	Crossbreed between Angoras and Pygmies	
Saanen	Switzerland		
Sable	Switzerland	Sables are often considered a subset of Saanens, but are recognized separately under ADGA	
San Clemente/Santa Catalina	Spain		
Savanna	South Africa		
Spanish	Spain		
Toggenburg	Switzerland		
