= West African Dwarf goats =

West African breed of goat

West African Dwarf
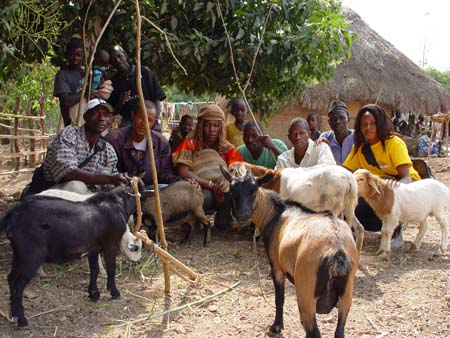
- Goats in Kabala, Sierra Leone
- Conservation status: FAO (2007): not at risk
- Other names: African Dwarf; Djallonké; Fouta Jallon; Grassland Dwarf; Chèvre Naine des Savanes; Guinean; Guinean Dwarf; Forest Goat; Pygmy
- Distribution: West Africa; Central Africa

Traits
- Weight: 20–30 kg
- Height: 40–50 cm
- Horn status: usually horned in both sexes
- Beard: males often bearded
- Tassels: sometimes present
- Goat; Capra aegagrus hircus

The West African Dwarf is a large and variable breed or group of breeds of domestic goat from coastal West and Central Africa, a range extending roughly from Senegal to Congo. It is characterised by achondroplasia or dwarfism, a trait that may have evolved in response to conditions in the humid forests of the area, and also by some degree of resistance to tsetse-borne trypanosomiasis or "sleeping sickness".

Many regional strains or breeds are within the group; other names for the group as a whole include African Dwarf, Djallonké or Fouta Jallon, Grassland Dwarf or Chèvre Naine des Savanes, Guinean or Guinean Dwarf, Forest Goat, and Pygmy.

== History ==
The West African Dwarf is a traditional breed of West and Central Africa. Its dwarf characteristics may have evolved as a response to conditions in the humid forests of the area.

The goats have at various times been exported to European countries and to the United States, initially as zoo animals or for laboratory research. Several breeds derive from these imports, among them the American Pygmy and Nigerian Dwarf in the United States, the Pygmy in the United Kingdom, the Dutch Dwarf or Nederlandse Dwerggeit in the Netherlands, and the Tibetana in Italy.

== Characteristics ==
The West African Dwarf goat is achondroplastic, with a typical height of 30 to 50 cm (12 to 20 in). Adult males weigh 20 to 25 kg (44 to 55 lb) and females 18 to 22 kg (40 to 49 lb). Both sexes have horns, which curve outwards and backwards in males. Males also have beards and sometimes manes. Characteristics include a relatively long neck, broad chest, and straight back. Legs are short and the udder is small but generally well-shaped. Most have short, stiff hair, and colour varies; dark brown with black points is probably the most common, but black, red, white, pied, and multicoloured goats also occur.

Numerous regional breeds or strains are noted within the overall West African Dwarf grouping. These include the Cameroon Dwarf in Cameroon, the Casamance in Senegal, the Côte d'Ivoire Dwarf in Côte d'Ivoire, the Djougry or Chèvre Nain de l'Est in Mauritania, the Ghan Forest in Ghana, the Kirdi in the north of Cameroon and in the south of Chad, the Kosi in Cameroon, and the Nigerian Dwarf in Nigeria. In Burkina Faso and Togo, the Fouta Djallon or Djallonké subgroup includes traditional strains including the Bath, the Kanem, the Kebbi, the Lac, the Massakori, the Mayo, and the Mossi.

== Use ==
West African Dwarf goats are important in the rural village economy of West Africa. Nigerian West African Dwarf goats are trypanotolerant (they resist to infections by Trypanosoma) and haemonchotolerant (they resist infections with the gastrointestinal parasite nematode Haemonchus contortus more effectively than other breeds of domestic goats).

West African Dwarf goats are capable of breeding at 12-18 months old. Multiple births are very common, with twins being normal and triplets frequent. The kidding interval averages about 220 days. These goats are typically kept as livestock by families who harvest or sell the milk and meat.

== See also ==
- Djallonké (disambiguation)
