= Pygora =

Pygora may refer to:

- Pygora goat or its fleece
- Pygora beetle
