= Nigora =

American breed of goat

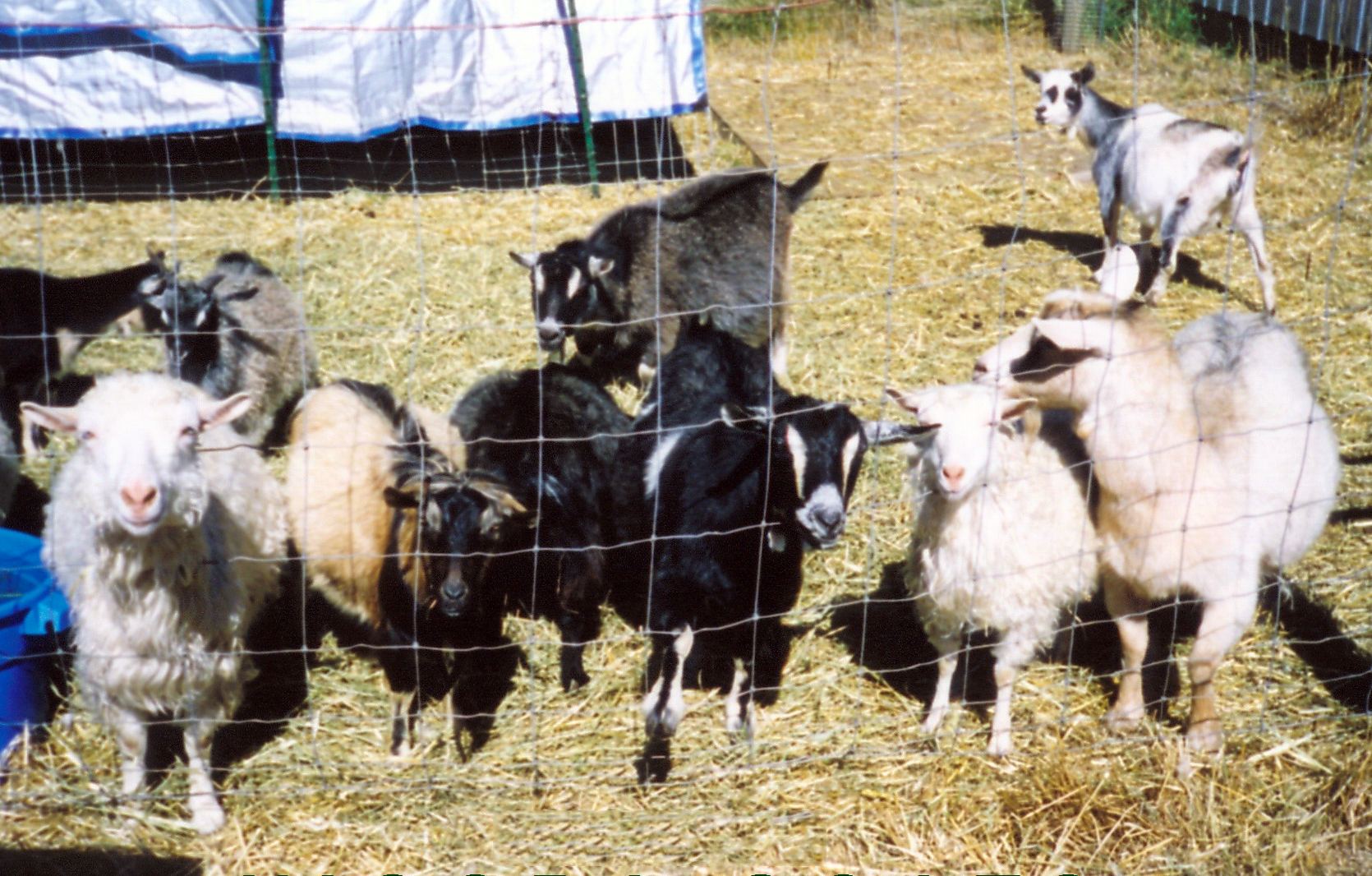
- Nigora goats photographed in 2002, showing Cocoa Puff of Skyview, the first Nigora (black doe with Swiss markings, upper center), then about 13 years old
- Country of origin: United States
- Standard: ANGBA
- Use: dual-purpose, milk and fiber

Traits
- Height: Male: 48–74 centimetres (19–29 in); Female: 48–74 centimetres (19–29 in)
- Coat: any
- Horn status: horned or hornless
- Goat; Capra aegagrus hircus

The Nigora is an American breed of small or medium-sized dual-purpose goat, raised both for its milk and for its fiber. It is the result of cross-breeding Nigerian Dwarf bucks with does of mohair breeds such as the Angora.

== History ==
The Nigora is of recent creation: breeding started in 1994. A breed society, the American Nigora Goat Breeders Association, was formed in 2007. Another association, the Nigora Goat Breeders Society, was active in 2014.

== Use ==
As with the Pygora breed, the fiber is classified into three types, A, B and C, depending on the length and type of the fibers. Type A is Angora-type mohair, long and lustrous; type B is "cashgora", which combines mohair with cashmere-type undercoat and is of medium length; type C is like cashmere and is shorter.
