= Pygora cruralis =

Scientific classification
- Kingdom: Animalia
- Phylum: Arthropoda
- Clade: Pancrustacea
- Class: Insecta
- Order: Coleoptera
- Suborder: Polyphaga
- Infraorder: Scarabaeiformia
- Family: Scarabaeidae
- Genus: Pygora
- Species: P. cruralis

Binomial name
- Pygora cruralis FAIRMAIRE, 1903

Species of beetle

Pygora cruralis is a species of Scarabaeidae, the dung beetle family. It is native to Madagascar. Also, it was discovered by Fairmaire.

== Etymology ==
Pygora Cruralis meant Leg-tailed Flower in Greek.

== Subspecies ==
- P. crualis meridionalis (Ruter, 1964)
