= American Angora Goat Breeders' Association =

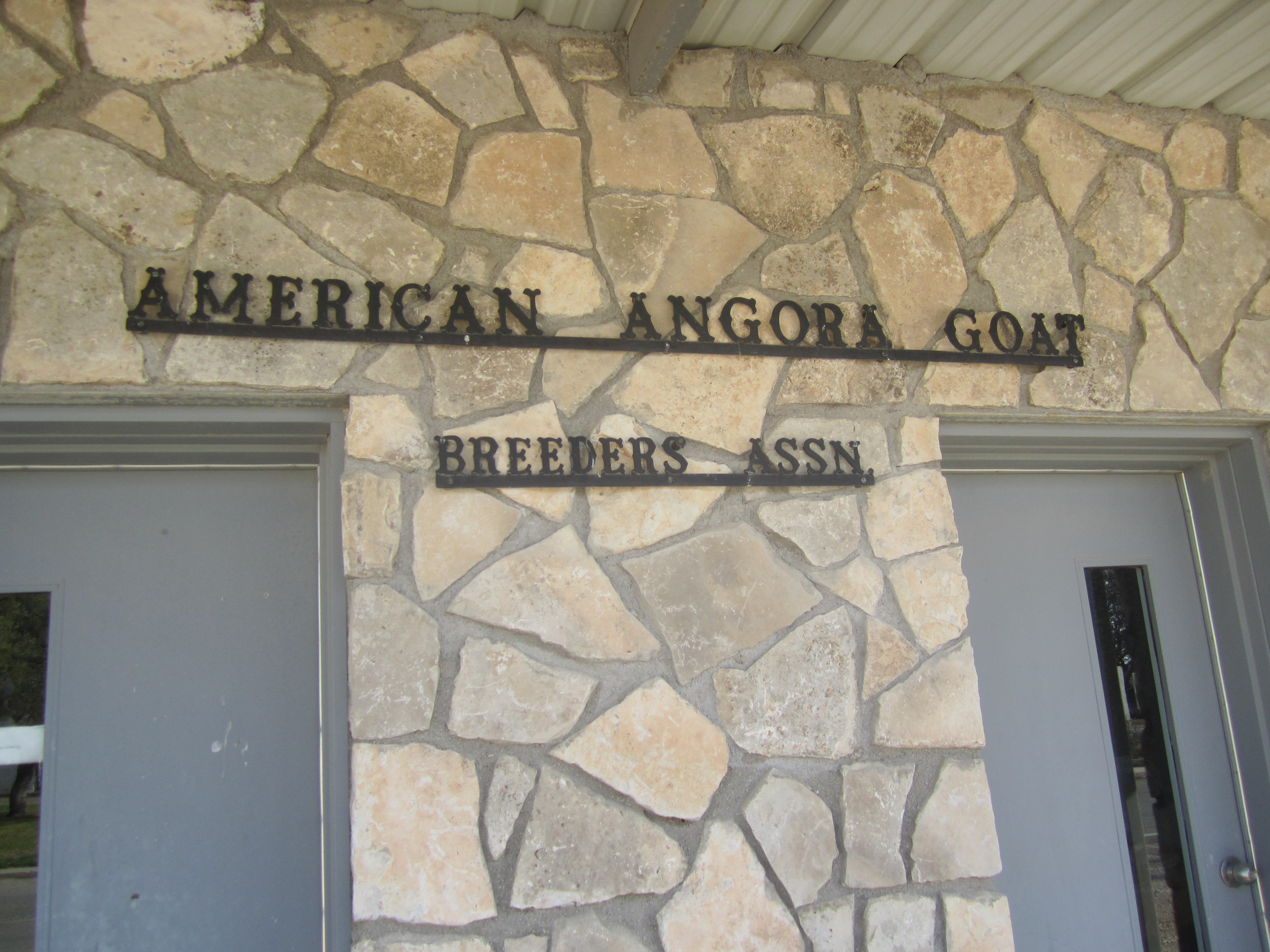
The American Angora Goat Breeder's Association is based in the small city of Rocksprings.

The American Angora Goat Breeders' Association is the only American breed registry for the Angora goat. Established in 1900, the association is headquartered in Rocksprings, Texas.
