= Pygora conjuncta =

Scientific classification
- Domain: Eukaryota
- Kingdom: Animalia
- Phylum: Arthropoda
- Class: Insecta
- Order: Coleoptera
- Suborder: Polyphaga
- Infraorder: Scarabaeiformia
- Family: Scarabaeidae
- Genus: Pygora
- Species: P. conjuncta

Binomial name
- Pygora conjuncta Gory & Percheron, 1835

Species of beetle

Pygora conjuncta is a species of Scarabaeidae, the dung beetle family.
