= Djallonké =

Djallonké or Djallonke may refer to:

- Djallonké people, also known as the Yalunka people
- The Djallonké or West African Dwarf sheep
- Djallonké or West African Dwarf goats
