= Pygora bioculata =

Scientific classification
- Kingdom: Animalia
- Phylum: Arthropoda
- Class: Insecta
- Order: Coleoptera
- Suborder: Polyphaga
- Infraorder: Scarabaeiformia
- Family: Scarabaeidae
- Genus: Pygora
- Species: P. bioculata

Binomial name
- Pygora bioculata Fairmaire, 1903

Species of beetle

Pygora bioculata is a species of Scarabaeidae, the dung beetle family.
