= Savanna goat =

South African breed of goat

- Conservation status: at risk
- Other names: Savannah goat; Savanna white goat; Savannah white goat
- Country of origin: South Africa
- Use: meat

Traits
- Skin color: black
- Hair color: white
- Goat; Capra aegagrus hircus

Savanna goats are a hardy breed of goat developed in South Africa alongside the Boer goat and Kalahari Red for meat production and imported to the United States in the late 1990s. Despite having similar production traits to Boers their popularity remains low outside of South Africa, and the Food and Agriculture Organization of the United Nations (FAO) categorizes their population status as "at risk" globally.

== Description ==
Savannas are large well muscled animals, ranging from 19–25 inches (48–64 cm) in height and weighing anywhere from 132 pounds (60 kg) up to 300 pounds (140 kg) for mature bucks. They have strong legs and bones, lop ears, and prominent Roman noses. Most animals are white (with black skin and hooves), but as the white coloration is a dominant trait goats with other colorations may crop up from recessive genes on occasion. In the United States the Pedigree International registry recognizes these colored goats as "American Royals".
