= American Pygmy =

American breed of goat

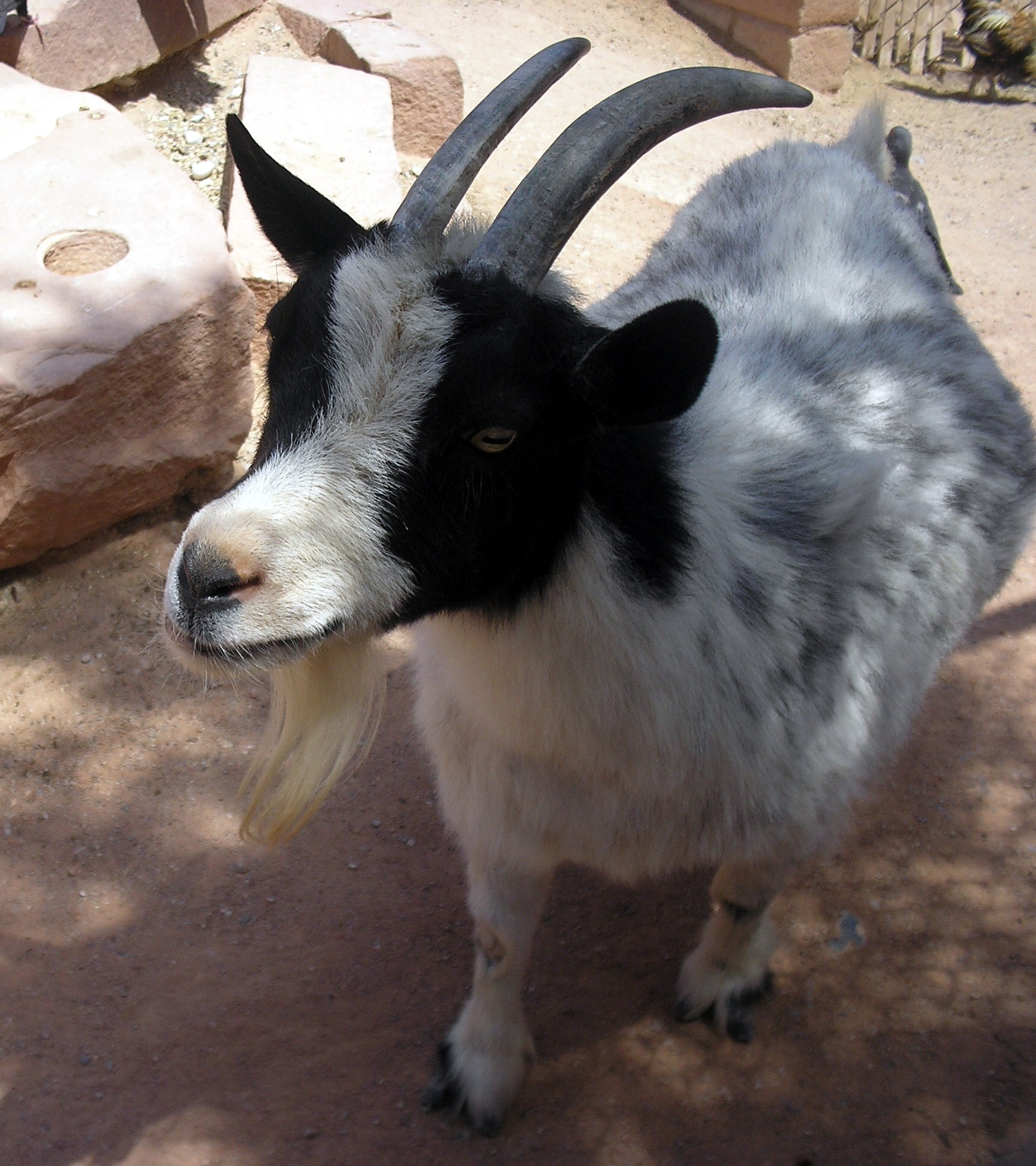
- At Las Vegas Zoo
- Conservation status: FAO (2007): endangered; DAD-IS (2023): at risk
- Other names: Pygmy Goat; African Pygmy
- Country of origin: United States
- Standard: National Pygmy Goat Association

Traits
- Weight: 23–39 kg(50.7-86 lb)
- Height: 40–50 cm(15.8-19.7 in)
- Horn status: horned in both sexes
- Beard: male: abundant; female: absent or sparse
- Goat; Capra aegagrus hircus

The American Pygmy is an American breed of achondroplastic (dwarf) goat. It is small, compact and stockily built. Like the Nigerian Dwarf, it derives from the West African Dwarf group of breeds of West Africa. Between 1930 and 1960, animals of this type were imported to the United States for use either as zoo animals or for research; some were later kept and bred as companion animals and established as a breed in 1975.

It may also be known as the Pygmy or African Pygmy. It is quite different and separate from the British Pygmy breed.

== History ==
Between about 1930 and 1960 a variety of small goats of the West African Dwarf group of breeds of West Africa were imported from zoos in Germany to the United States, to be exhibited in zoos or used as research animals. Some came into the hands of private breeders who kept and bred them as companion animals. By the 1970s, two distinct types had developed: one broad, compact and solid like the original African stock, the other more delicate, much like a dairy goat in miniature. The latter became the Nigerian Dwarf, while the former became the American Pygmy, for which a breed society was established in 1975, and a herd book started in the same year.

In 2007 the conservation status of the American Pygmy was listed by the Food and Agriculture Organization of the United Nations as "endangered". In 2023 its transboundary risk level was listed in the DAD-IS breed database as "at risk"; its risk level in the United States is unknown – no population data has ever been reported to DAD-IS by the United States Department of Agriculture. In 2019 it was not on the heritage breed watchlist of the Livestock Conservancy.

Two modern American breeds derive in part from the American Pygmy: the Kinder was created by cross-breeding with the Nubian, the Pygora from crossing with Angora stock.

== Characteristics ==
The American Pygmy is small and stocky, with heavy bone: height at the withers is usually in the range 40 to 50 cm (16 to 20 in), with weights of the order of 25 to 40 kg (55 to 90 lb). Seven color variations are recognised in the breed standard: caramel with black markings, caramel with brown markings, brown agouti, grey agouti, black agouti, black with white markings, and solid black.

It is polyestrous, prolific and precocious – kids may become sexually mature at two months. Gestation normally lasts 145–153 days.

== Use ==
The American Pygmy is reared for meat or as a companion animal; many are kept in zoos. Because of its small size and ease of handling it may be used for scientific research; it has been found to be a good producer of antibodies for immunological research.
