= Pygora cowani =

Scientific classification
- Domain: Eukaryota
- Kingdom: Animalia
- Phylum: Arthropoda
- Class: Insecta
- Order: Coleoptera
- Suborder: Polyphaga
- Infraorder: Scarabaeiformia
- Family: Scarabaeidae
- Genus: Pygora
- Species: P. cowani

Binomial name
- Pygora cowani Waterhouse, 1878

Species of beetle

Pygora cowani is a species of Scarabaeidae, the dung beetle family.

== Subspecies ==
- P. cowani clementi (Ruter, 1964)
