= Sunflower Farm =

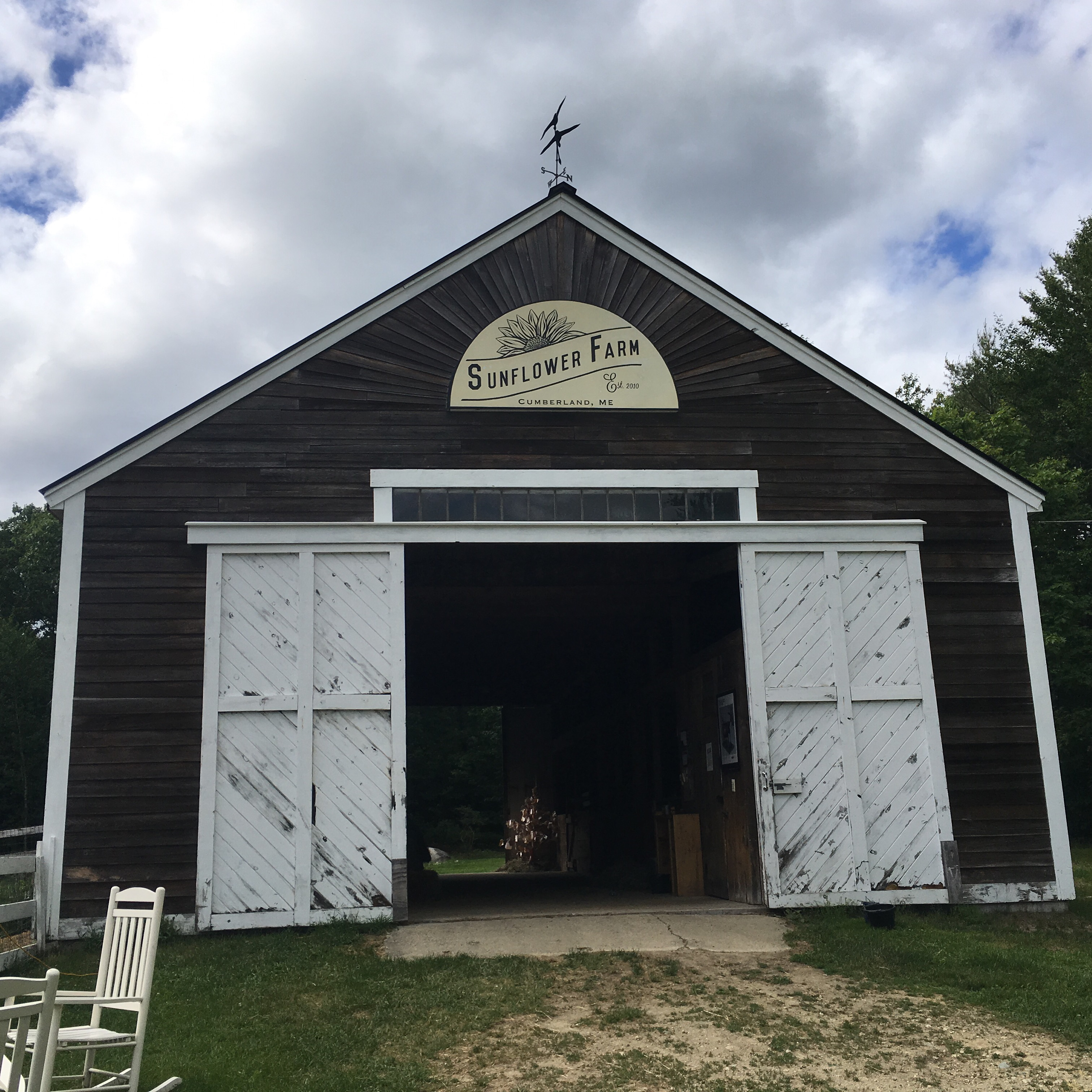
- The farm's barn

- Location within Maine
- Town/City: Cumberland
- State: Maine
- Country: United States
- Coordinates: 43.841639°N 70.299073°W
- Established: 2010 (16 years ago)
- Owner: Chris Hall; Hope Hall
- Website: http://sunflowerfarm.info

Sunflower Farm (also known as Sunflower Farm Creamery) is a farm in Cumberland, Maine, United States. Established in 2010, it has become noted for its pajama-wearing Nigerian Dwarf goats. As of 2025, the farm's "running of the goats" YouTube video has reached 4.5 million views since it was posted in 2014.

The farm is run by Chris and Hope Hall.

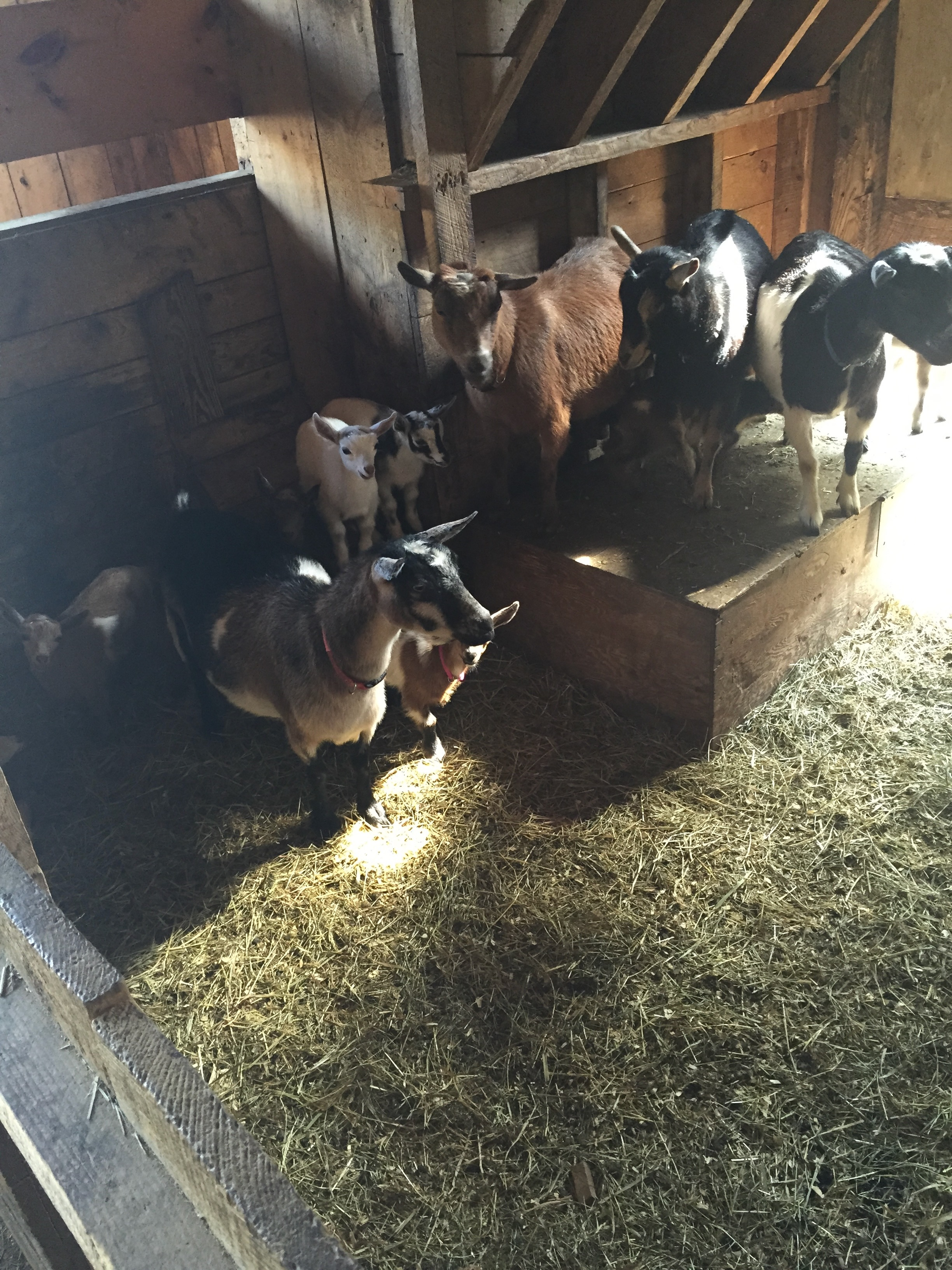
Some of the farm's goat herd in 2015
