= Southern Nevada Zoological-Botanical Park =

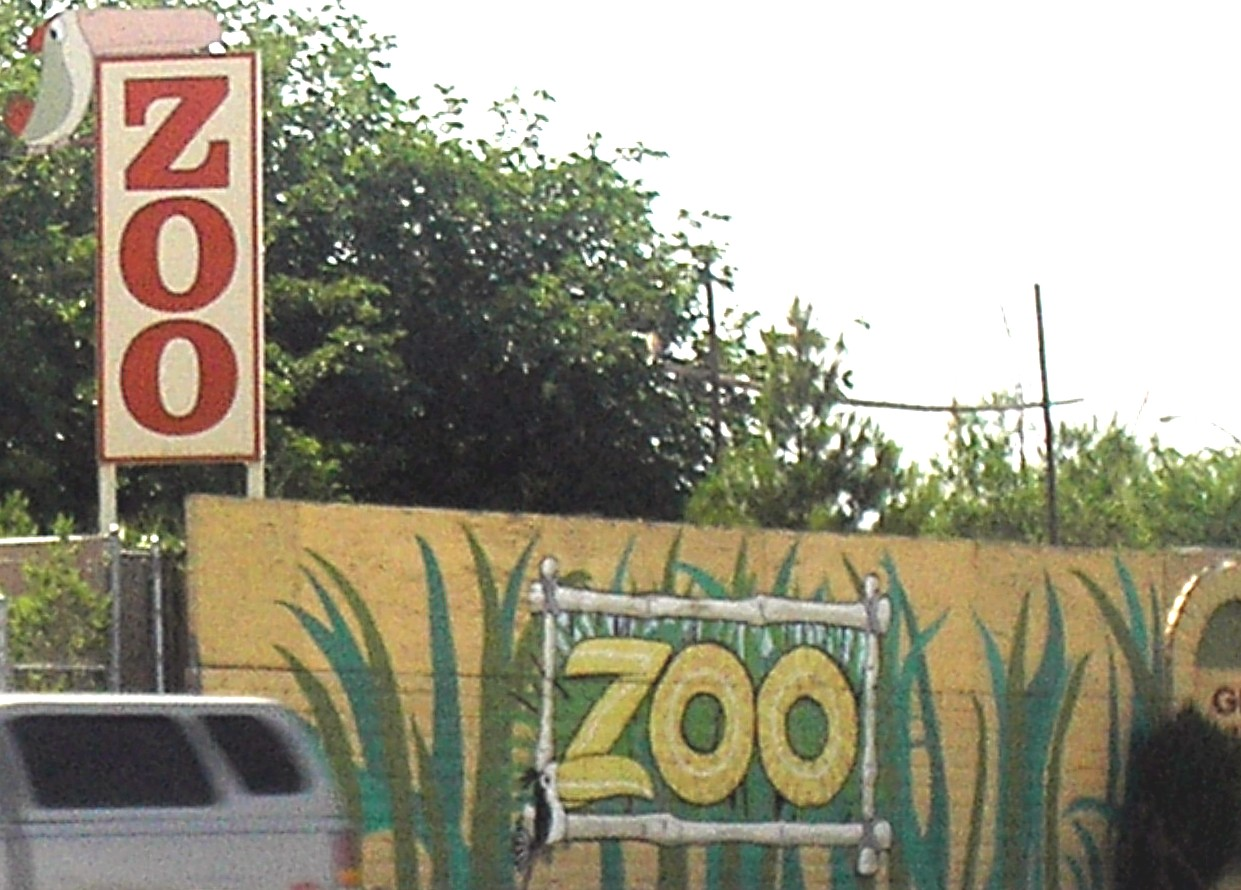
- Park exterior and sign
- Interactive map of Southern Nevada; Zoological-Botanical Park
- 36.19217°N 115.1895905°W
- Date opened: March 1981
- Date closed: September 20, 2013
- Location: 1775 North Rancho Drive, Las Vegas, Nevada, United States
- Land area: 3 acres (1.2 ha)
- No. of species: 150+
- Website: www.LasVegasZoo.com (Archived)

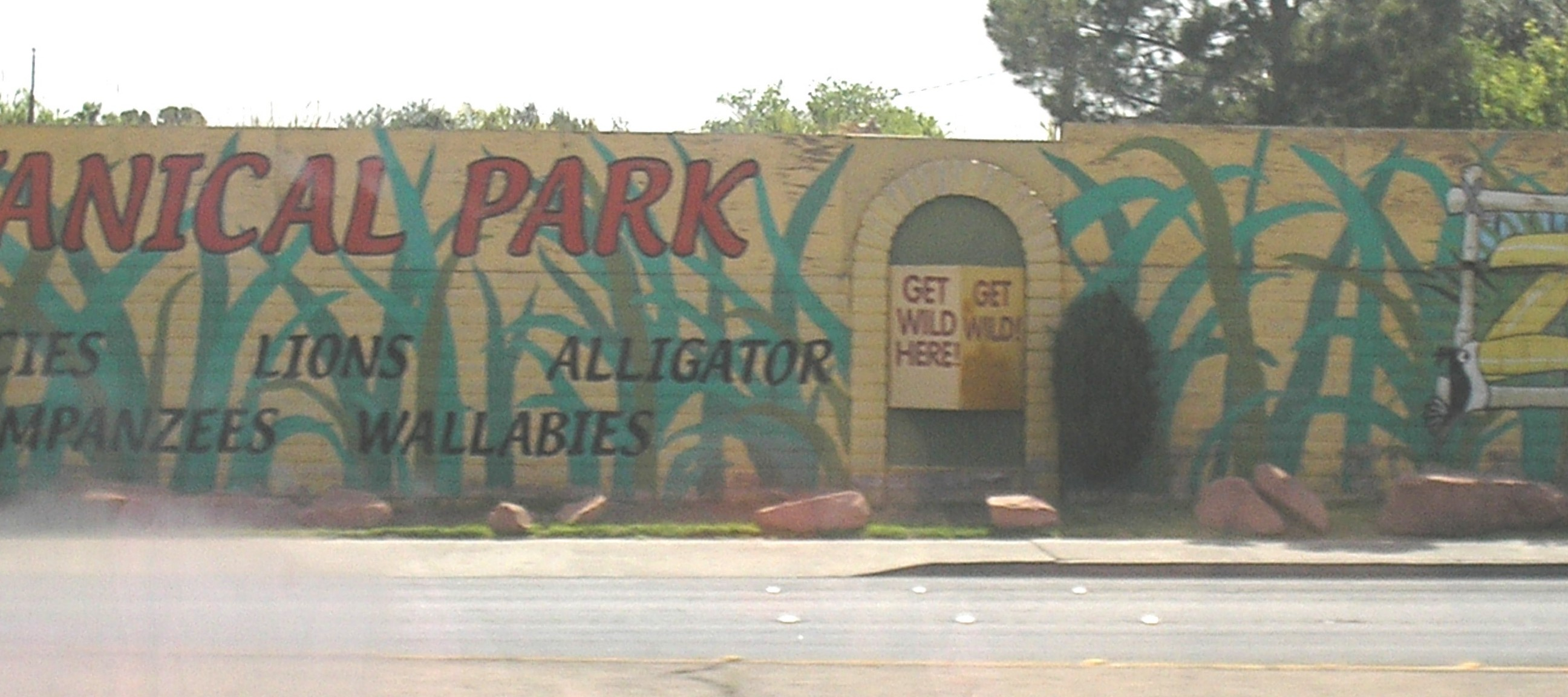
Exterior of the park

The Southern Nevada Zoological-Botanical Park, informally known as the Las Vegas Zoo, was a 3-acre (1.2 ha), nonprofit zoo and botanical garden located in Las Vegas, Nevada that operated from 1981 to September 20, 2013. It was located northwest of the Las Vegas Strip, about 15 minutes away. It focused primarily on the education of desert life and habitat protection. Its mission statement was to "educate and entertain the public by displaying a variety of plants and animals". An admission fee was charged. The park included a small gem exhibit area and a small gift shop at the main exit. The gift shop and admission fees helped support the zoo.

== Background ==
An earlier zoo, the Las Vegas Valley Zoo, opened in 1973, at Las Vegas' Tule Springs Park (later the Floyd R. Lamb State Park). In 1975, the Las Vegas Zoological Society entered a 99-year lease with the city council for 255 acres at Tule Springs. The Las Vegas Valley Zoo, located one mile away on three acres of land, was to relocate to a new, expanded zoo that would be built on the new acreage. The new land was leased for $1 a year on the condition that it only be used for a zoo. The new Las Vegas Valley Zoo would consist of 25 solar-powered geodesic domes that would house the animals. The zoo experienced financial problems, and the plans for relocation never materialized.

The Southern Nevada Zoological-Botanical Park was started by Pat Dingle (1947–2018), a Vietnam War veteran who later spent 12 years with the North Las Vegas Police Department. In addition to the Southern Nevada Zoological-Botanical Park, Dingle also held the 1975 lease on the acreage at Floyd Lamb State Park. Dingle, a bird enthusiast, initially opened a local bird store in 1979, and the business was successful enough for him to retire in 1980 from his job as chief of detectives. Dingle moved his bird store to the site of the eventual zoo in 1981. Officials from the San Diego Zoo became aware of Dingle's bird interest and encouraged him to build exhibits for rare and endangered species, leading to the creation of the zoo. Nevada did not have a zoo at the time, which also gave Dingle the idea to open one.

== History ==
The zoo opened in 1981, as the Southern Nevada Zoological Park, located on a half-acre site at 1775 North Rancho Drive in Las Vegas. To start the petting zoo, Dingle purchased several animals, including a llama, goats, and sheep. Dingle's wife Muffye operated the zoo with seven full-time zookeepers. An animal hospital was located on-site for the zoo's inhabitants, and was also open to the public. As of 1986, the zoo featured 50 animals, as well as 150 birds. Among the animals were six Barbary apes and a dozen grivet monkeys, both species provided by the San Diego Zoo. The Barbary apes were loaned to the zoo for a breeding program. Half of the zoo's animals came from private local owners. Dingle said, "This town is full of fascinating people from all over the world, people with exotic tastes. Keeping lions, tigers and leopards as family pets isn't all that unusual in Las Vegas."

In 1989, through the Community Development Block Grant program, the city gave a $157,000 loan to Dingle's corporation, Southern Nevada Zoological Park Inc. Dingle would ultimately default twice on the loan. In 1992, Dingle unveiled plans for a new biological park named Deserts of the World Biopark, to be built on the nearby 250 acres. In addition to animals, the new park would also include nuclear test relics from the Nevada Test Site. The first phase would cost an estimated $10 million to $15 million. However, Dingle owed debt to various entities in relation to the current zoo, which prevented the new zoo from being built. As of 1993, the zoo had approximately 150 animals and 45 outdoor exhibits, with a yearly operating budget of $250,000.

In May 1993, a young Barbary ape was killed by an older, larger individual of the same species when they were introduced to each other in the same enclosure. Dingle declined to let employees intervene and prevent the older ape from beating the younger one, as Dingle stated that such dominant behavior was normal towards a new ape during introductions. Dingle had the two apes stay in the same enclosure overnight, and did not allow employees to monitor the two during the night. The younger ape died the next day from injuries caused by the older individual. Seven zoo employees resigned in protest, and Dingle fired two others in response. Local television stations aired numerous stories about the ape's death, including a videotape of the beating.

The U.S. Department of Agriculture (USDA) inspected the zoo and found that Dingle was not in compliance with the law, in relation to the ape's death. Dingle subsequently said that the younger ape may have been poisoned by radical animal rights activists with the hope of shutting the zoo down. In July 1993, approximately 25 protesters, mostly former employees, staged a weekend demonstration outside the zoo calling for Dingle's involvement to be terminated. Following the ape's death and the negative publicity, the zoo had a 30 percent increase in ticket sales. For the next several years, critics would continue to hold protest rallies outside the zoo each year to mark the death of the ape.

Dingle stopped making payments on the city loan in November 1993. In 1995, because of recent improvements, the zoo reached a new annual high of 53,173 visitors. However, according to Dingle, the longstanding controversy over the ape's death dissuaded possible donors and prevented growth of the zoo. In December 1995, the city sued Dingle and threatened to foreclose on the Southern Nevada Zoological-Botanical Park if he did not repay the loan immediately.

In February 1996, former employees for the zoo, including veterinarians, publicly stated that Dingle regularly ignored their animal advice, and that he verbally abused and intimidated employees and volunteers. Dingle stated that his critics were a small group of "misfits" and disgruntled employees. The USDA inspected the zoo in April and May 1996, and discovered new issues regarding animal treatment. The USDA also investigated the May 1995 death of a chimpanzee which died six days after arriving at the zoo; the department collected evidence relating to the chimp's veterinary care prior to its death. Three wild cats on loan to the zoo were removed from the property by its owner, due to concerns over the zoo's problems with the USDA. Later in 1996, Dingle and the USDA reached a settlement over the 1993 ape death, which had resulted in a 16-count complaint from the department. The settlement included closing the zoo for seven days and Dingle paying a fine of $7,500. Former employees were disappointed with the settlement, although the USDA stated that it usually avoids harsher sanctions because they result in less funding for food to feed animals.

During 1996, Dingle lost the zoo's 1.5-acre (0.61 ha) parking lot to foreclosure. The zoo was situated on four parcels – including the parking lot – that totaled approximately four acres. Without having to make further mortgage payments for the parking lot parcel, Dingle hoped to pay off the city loan and possibly have money left to expand the zoo. The city lawsuit was settled in January 1998, when Dingle agreed to turn over his lease on the state park acreage in exchange for the retirement of his loan. Improvements at the zoo were underway in 1998. In 2009, the San Diego Zoo donated $15,000 to the zoo to renovate an animal habitat.

The zoo closed on September 20, 2013, when the last remaining staff members quit. A complaint was filed with the USDA over treatment of the animals, and it was announced later in the month that the closure would be permanent, with the animals being relocated. The vacant wood-frame, one-story zoo building was subsequently used by homeless people. The building was burned in a fire on April 30, 2016, and plans were made to demolish it due to a risk of collapse.

== Exhibits ==
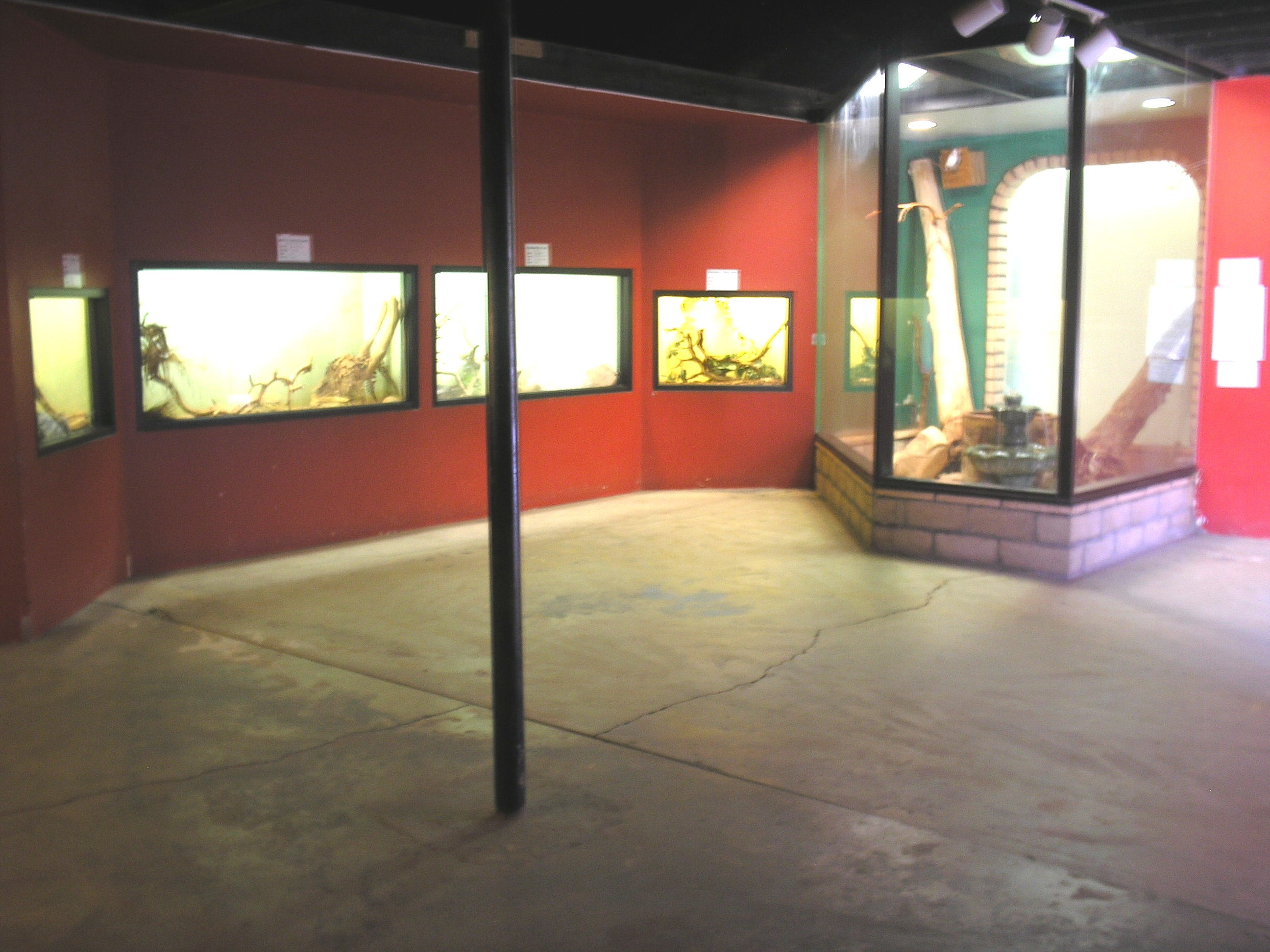
Reptile/Desert Room

The zoological park exhibited over 150 species of plants and animals, including the last family of Barbary apes in the United States. Other animals displayed include:

- Alligator
- Bali mynah
- African lion
- Cougar
- Coyote
- Eurasian lynx
- Fossa
- Golden eagle
- Chimpanzee
- Chilean flamingo
- Chinese alligator
- Eagle
- Emu
- North American river otter
- Ostrich
- Parrot
- King vulture
- Caracals from Turkmenistan
- Reptiles - includes all species of venomous reptiles native to Southern Nevada.
- Tiger
- Wallabies

=== Displays ===
- Bamboo
- Cycad

== Gallery ==
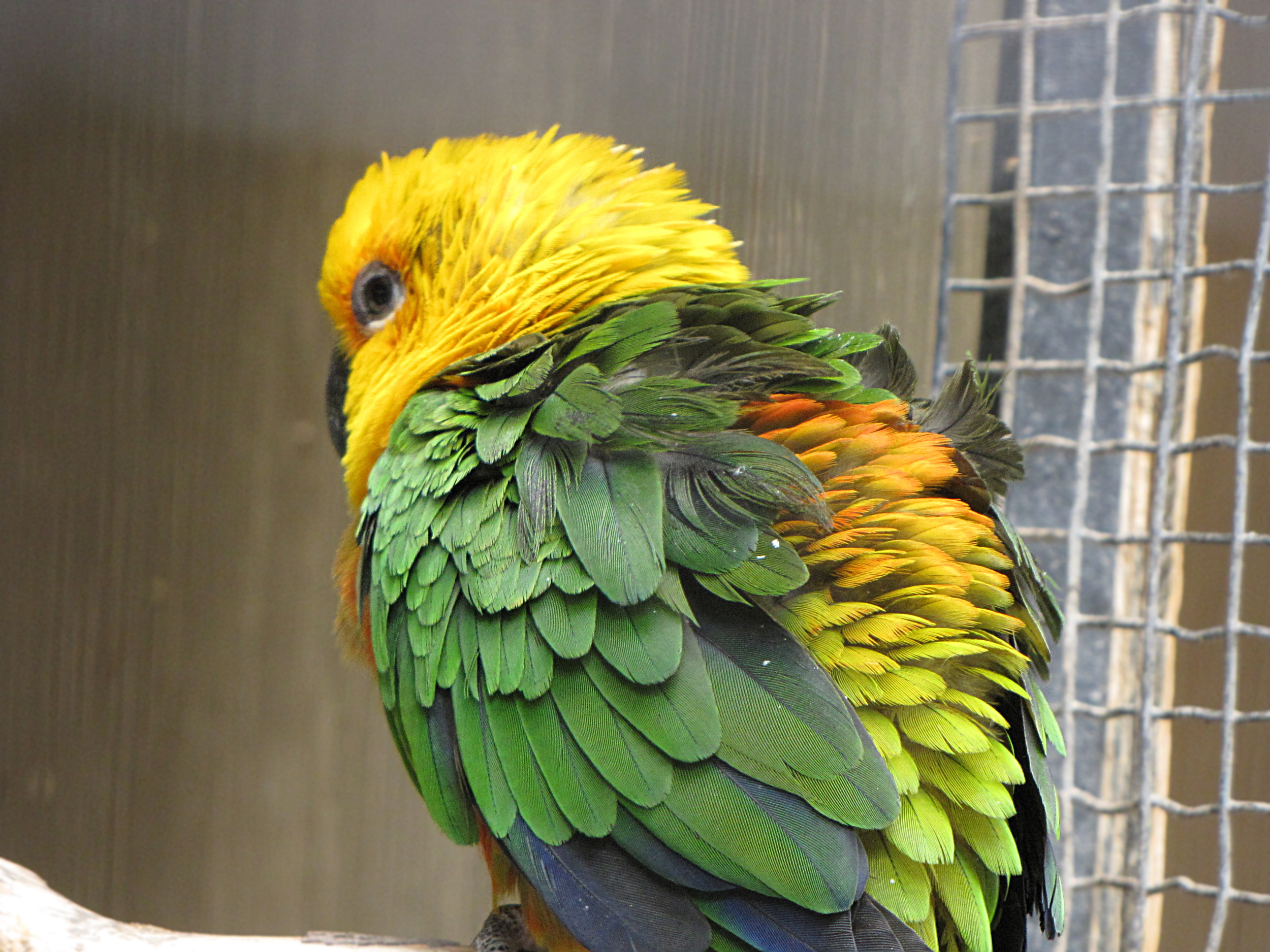
Jenday conure

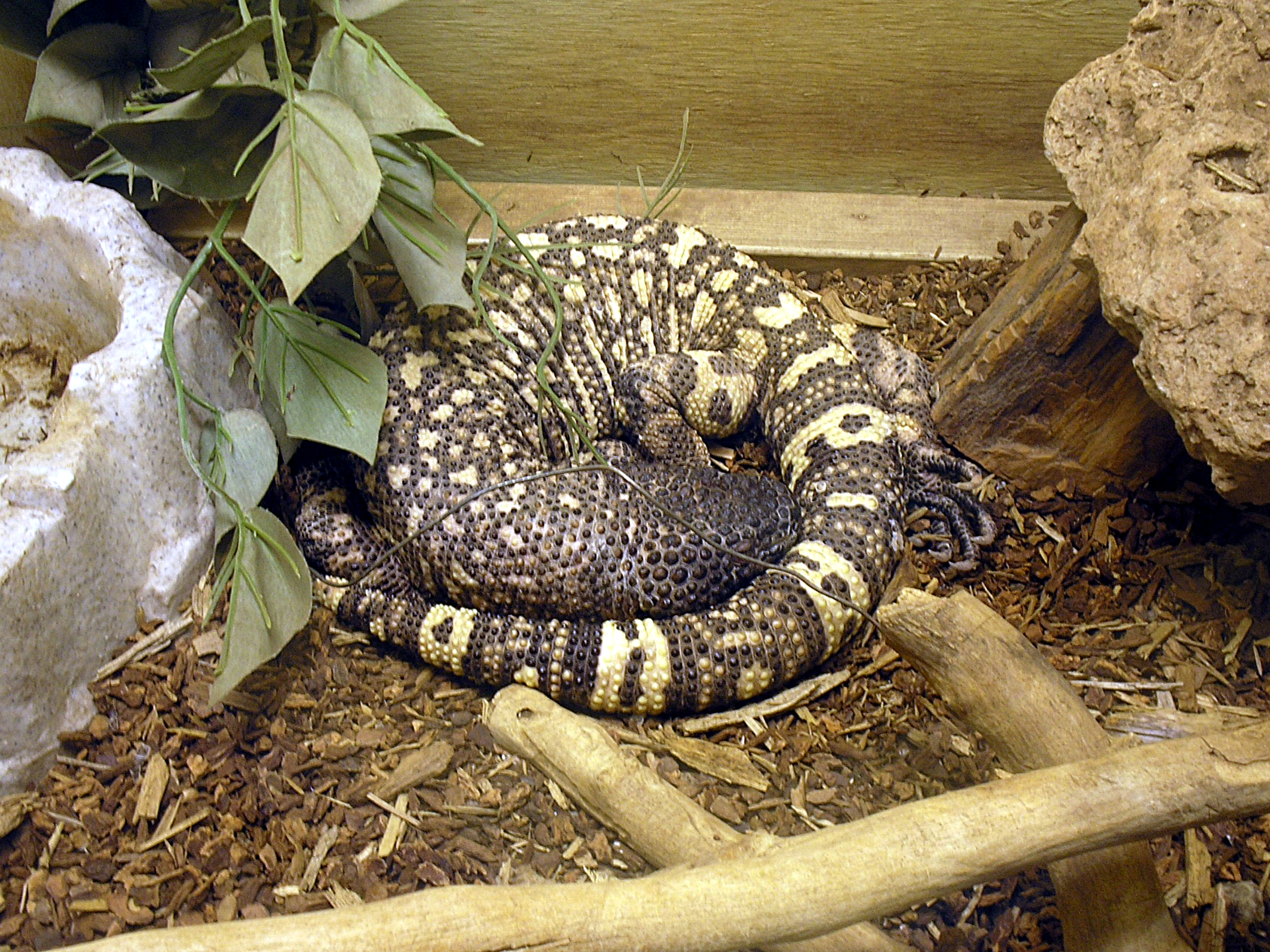
Mexican beaded lizard

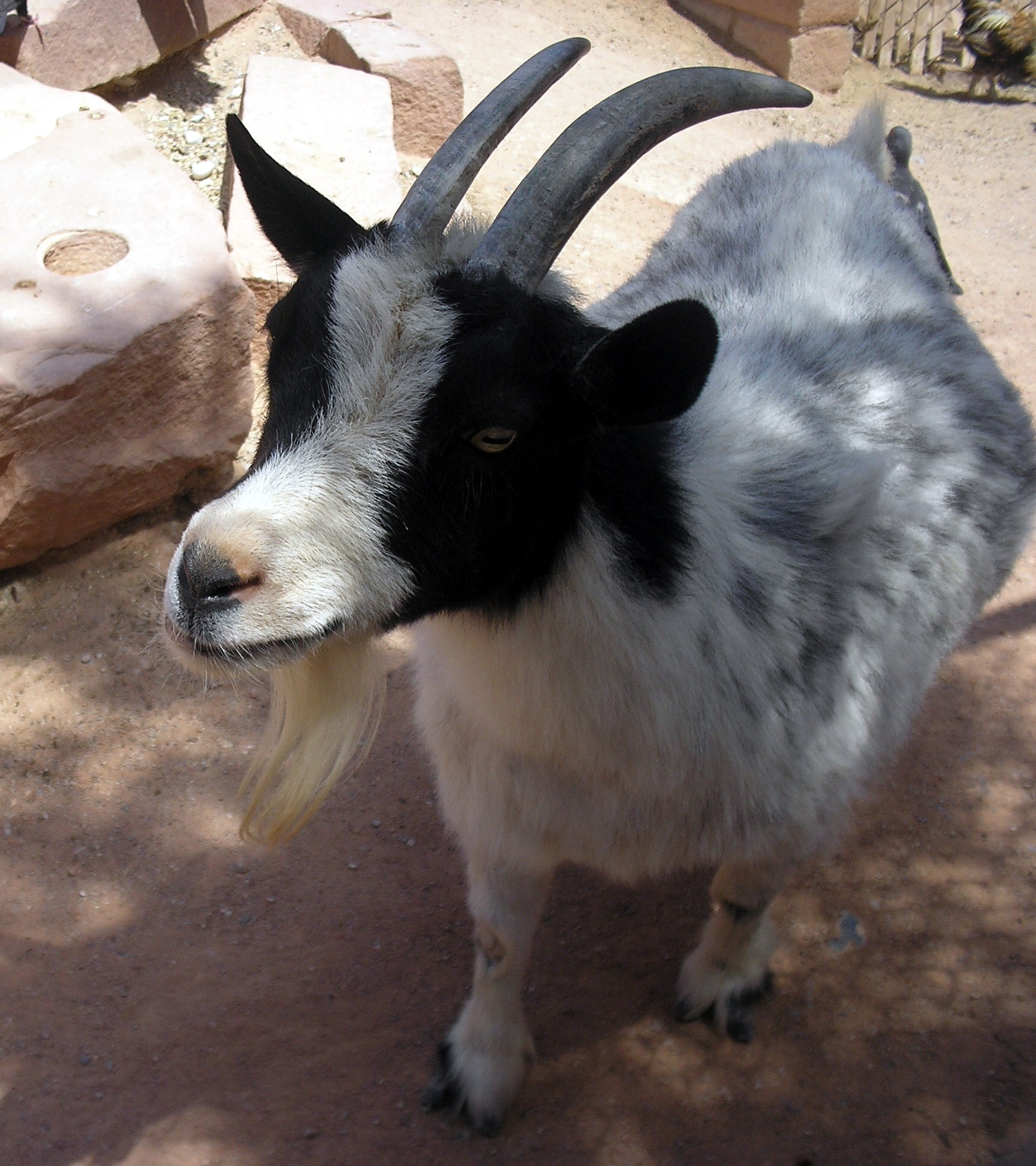
Pygmy goat

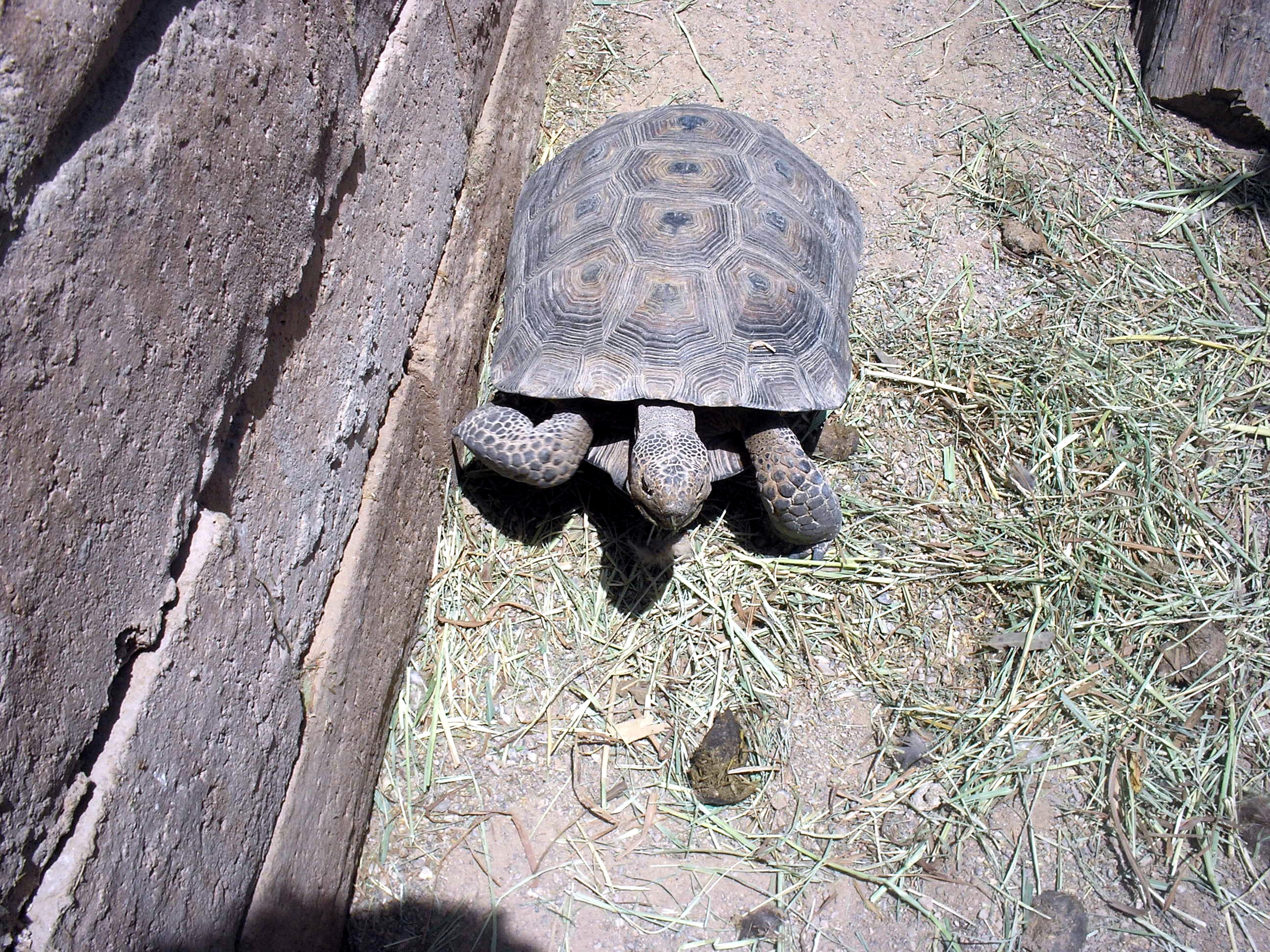
Desert tortoise

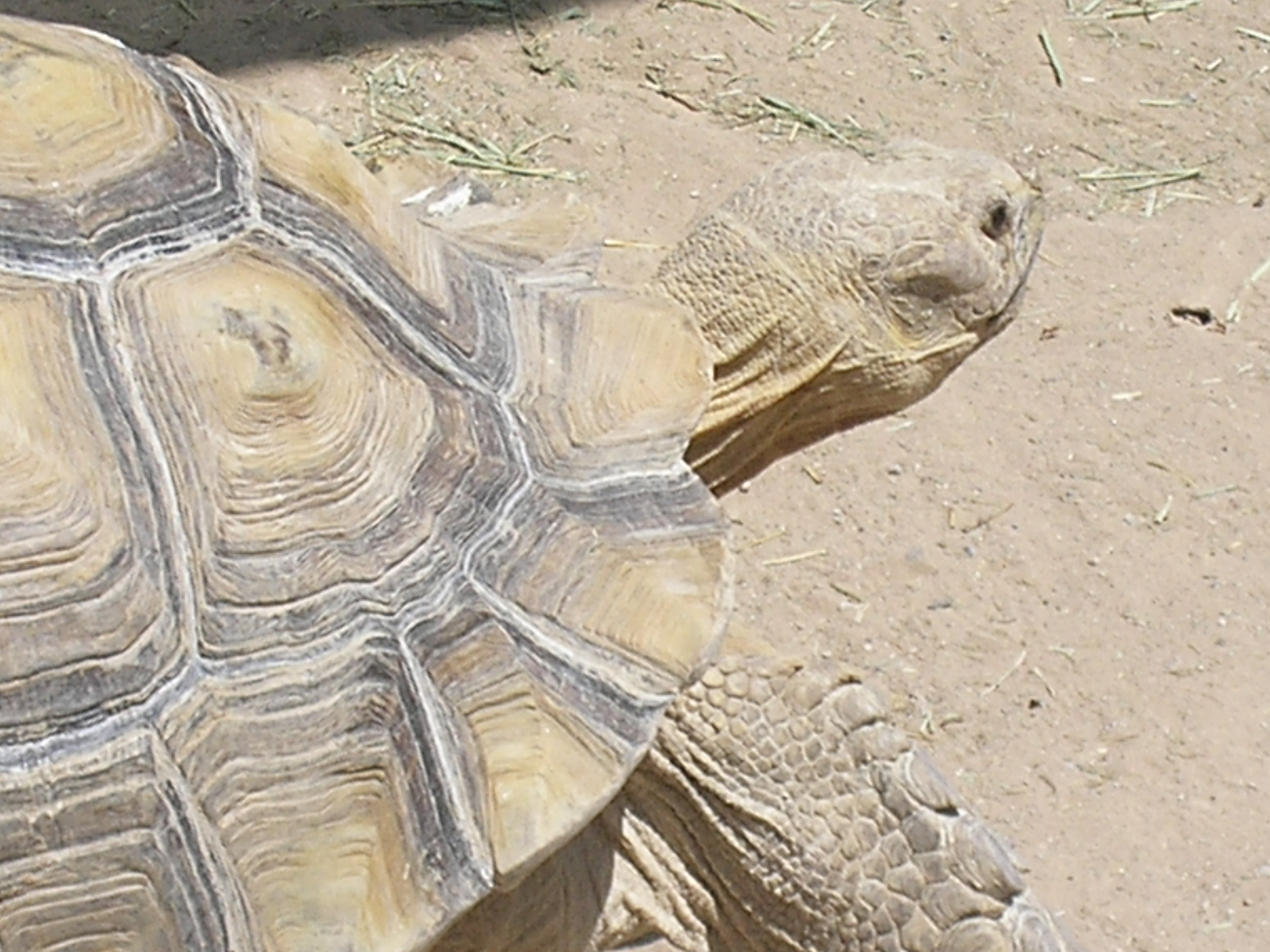
African spurred tortoise

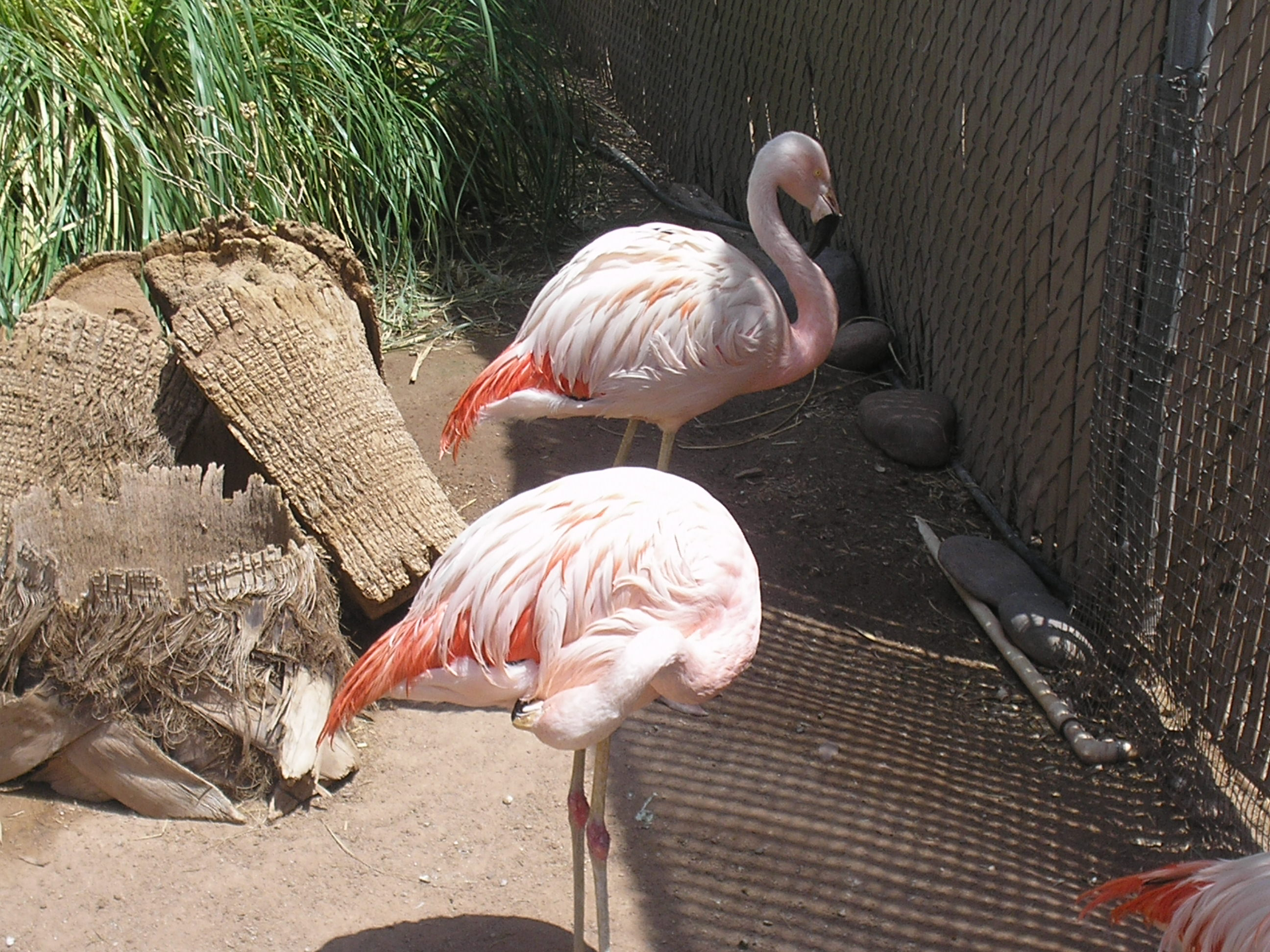
Flamingo

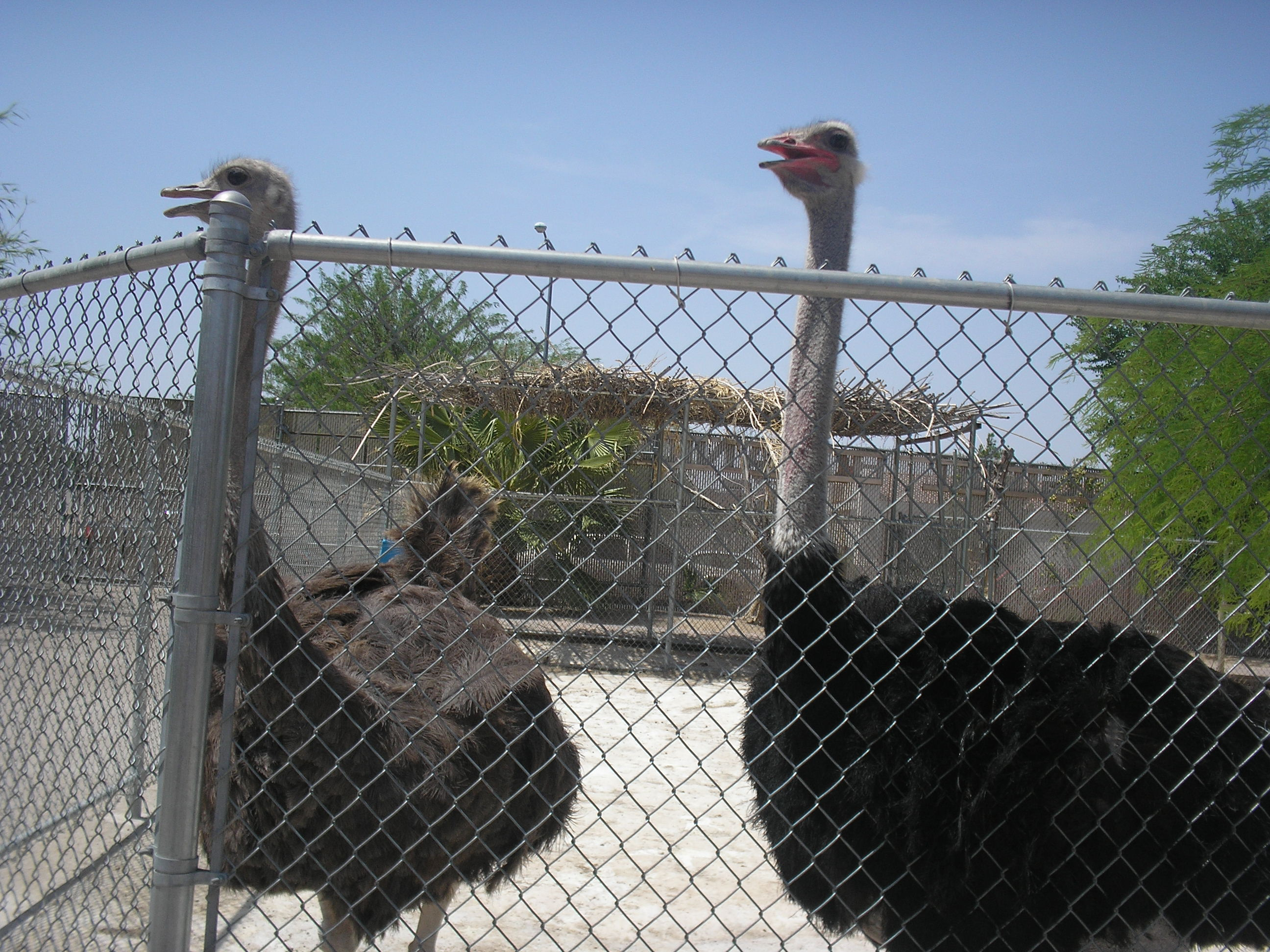
Ostrich

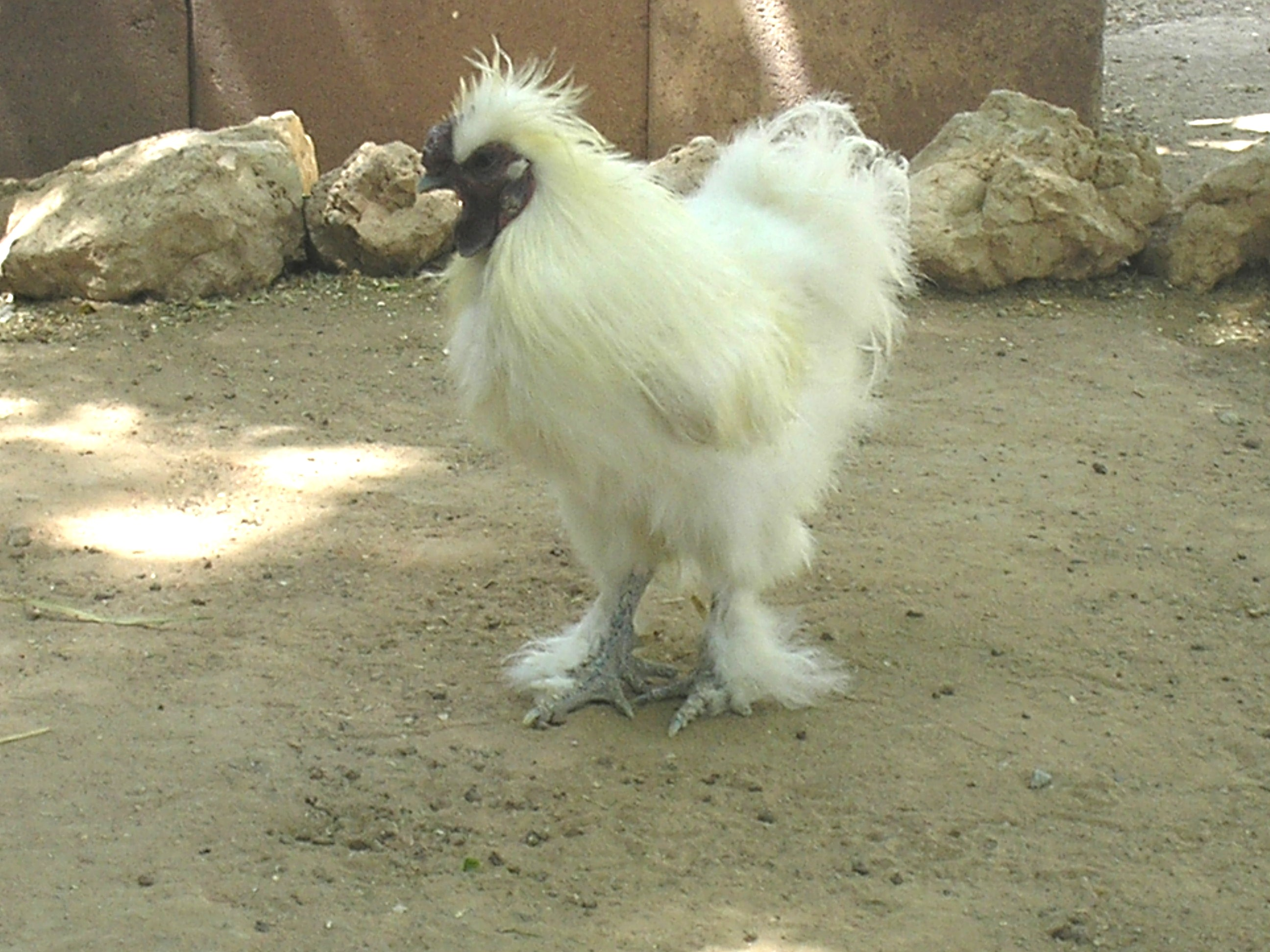
The zoo featured free roaming animals, such as this chicken

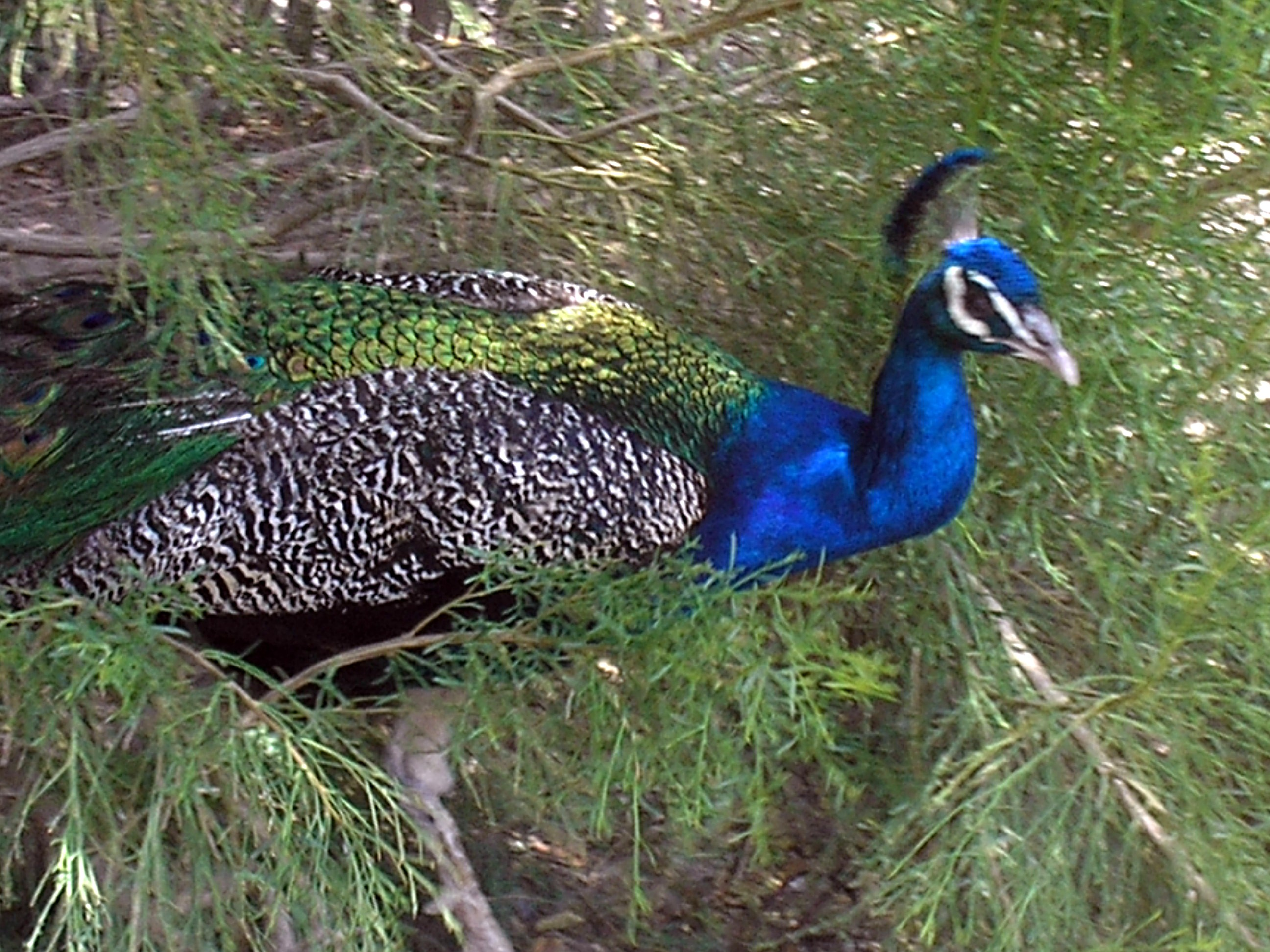
Peafowl, one of the free roaming animals at the park

== See also ==
- List of botanical gardens in the United States
