= Pygora descarpentriesi =

Scientific classification
- Domain: Eukaryota
- Kingdom: Animalia
- Phylum: Arthropoda
- Class: Insecta
- Order: Coleoptera
- Suborder: Polyphaga
- Infraorder: Scarabaeiformia
- Family: Scarabaeidae
- Genus: Pygora
- Species: P. descarpentriesi

Binomial name
- Pygora descarpentriesi Ruter, 1973

Species of beetle

Pygora descarpentriesi is a species of Scarabaeidae, the dung beetle family.
