= Nigerian Dwarf =

American breed of goat

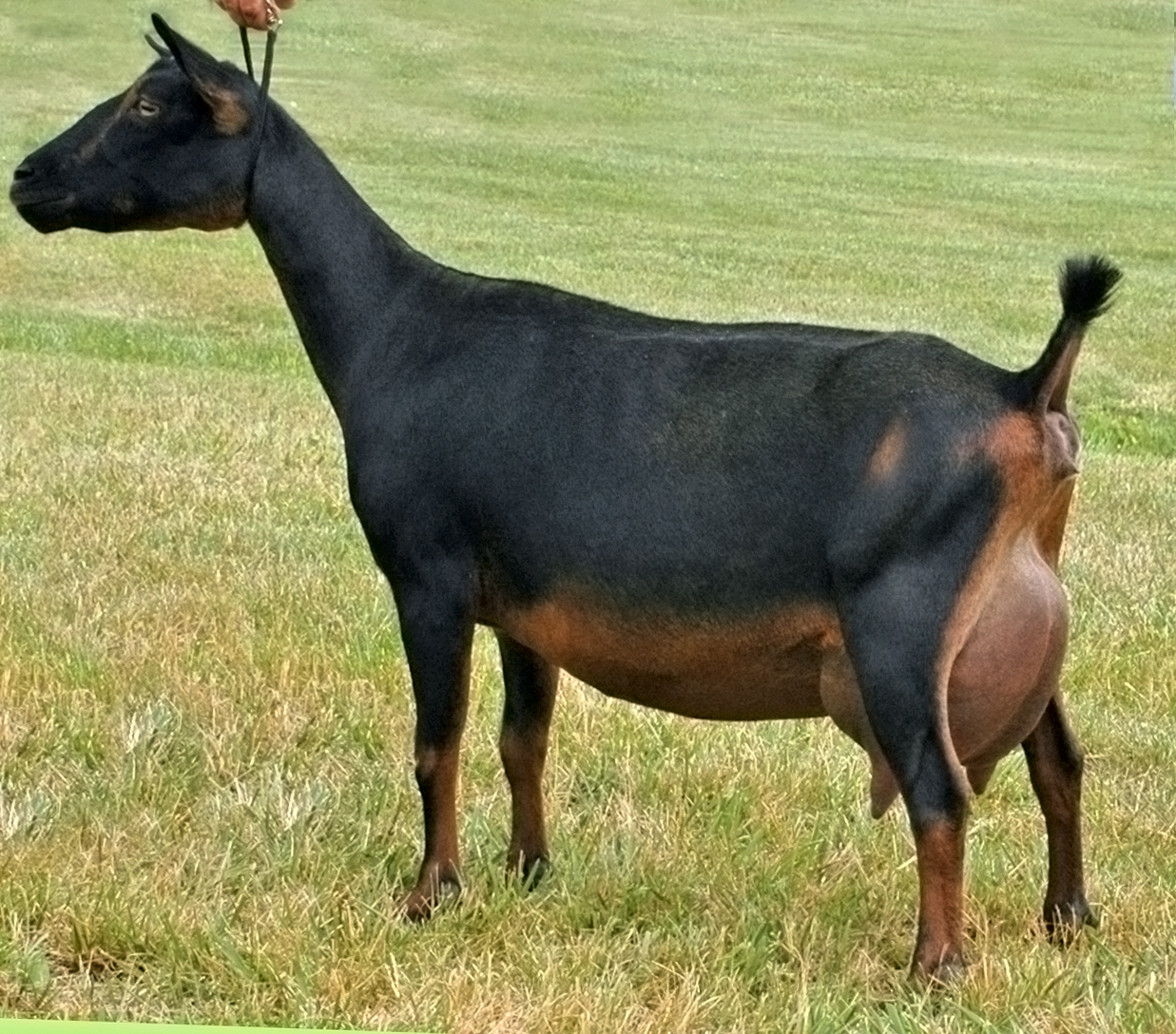
- Doe in milk
- Conservation status: FAO (2007): critical; ALBC (2012): recovering; DAD-IS (2023): not at risk
- Country of origin: United States
- Standard: Nigerian Dwarf Goat Association; American Dairy Goat Association; American Goat Society; American Nigerian Dwarf Dairy Association
- Use: milk; meat; show; companion animal

Traits
- Weight: 35 kg (75 lb)
- Height: Male: maximum 60 cm (24 in); Female: maximum 57 cm (22 in)
- Coat: any color
- Horn status: horned or hornless
- Goat; Capra aegagrus hircus

The Nigerian Dwarf is a modern American breed of dwarf goat. Like the American Pygmy Goat, it derives from the West African Dwarf group of breeds of West Africa.

== History ==
Between about 1930 and 1960 a variety of small goats of the West African Dwarf group of breeds were imported from Africa to the United States to be exhibited in zoos. The Nigerian Dwarf, like the American Pygmy Goat, derives from these, but does not resemble the stocky West African Dwarf in conformation – it has been bred to have the appearance of a miniature dairy goat. It was at first reared as a show breed and companion animal; selection was for appearance and for docility. It was later found to be suitable for small-scale dairy production, and some breeding was directed towards dairy qualities. A herd-book was established in 1980.

Numbers grew rapidly; by 2002 there were almost 7000 head registered. The breed was recognized by the American Dairy Goat Association in 2005. The Nigerian Dwarf was formerly listed on the heritage breeds watchlist of the Livestock Conservancy as "recovering", but was removed from the list in 2013.

In 2023 the total number of the goats in the United States was just under 40000; populations numbering 1000–2000 head are reported by Australia and Canada. In 2024 the international conservation status of the breed was "not at risk".

In the 1990s the Nigora breed was created by cross-breeding the Nigerian Dwarf with Angora and other mohair breeds.

== Characteristics ==
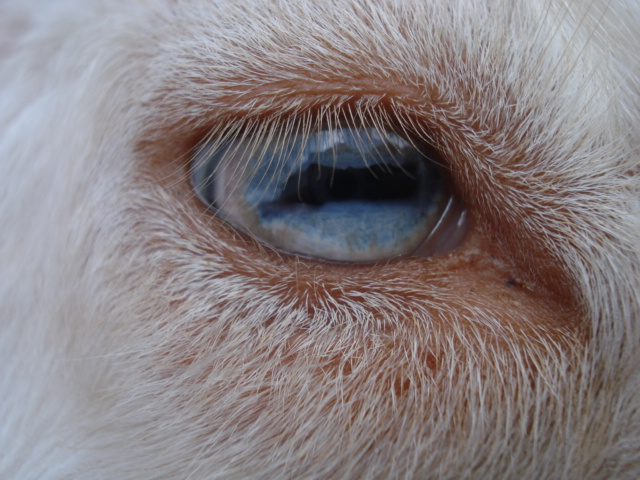
The eyes may be blue

The Nigerian Dwarf is small but well-proportioned; its conformation resembles that of larger dairy goats. It may be horned or naturally hornless. The coat is fine and fairly short, and may be of any color, or multicolored; common colors are gold, chocolate and black, frequently with white markings. The facial profile may be concave or straight; the ears are upright. The average weight is approximately 35 kg (75 lb), while maximum height is about 60 cm (24 in) for males and slightly less for females; stock bred for dairy performance may be rather larger than show or companion animals.

It is a precocious breed – young stock may be bred from an early age: males from about three months, females from seven or eight months. The gestation period is in the range 145–153 days; the twinning rate is high, and triplet and quadruplet births are not uncommon. Life expectancy is from eight to 12 years.

== Use ==
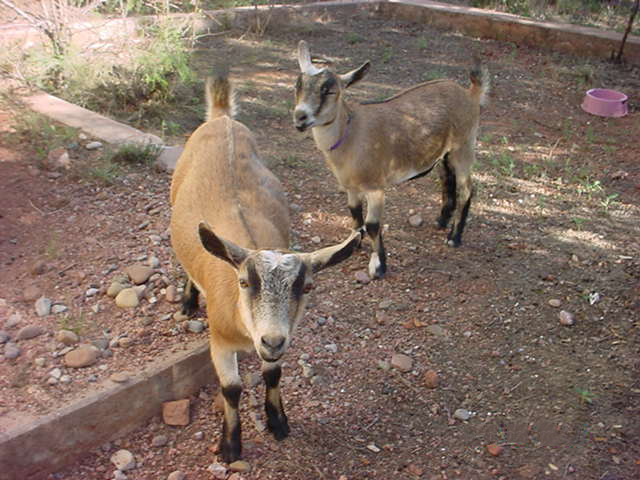
Nigerian Dwarf twins

The Nigerian Dwarf was originally bred for show and as a companion animal. It was later also bred for dairy use. Average milk yield of dairy stock is 340 kg (750 lb) per year; a yield of 993 kg (2190 lb) in a lactation of 305 days was recorded in 2018. Lactation usually lasts for about ten months. The milk is high in butterfat and protein, averaging 6.5% and 3.9% respectively, and is suitable for making cheese and butter.

== See also ==
- Sunflower Farm, a Nigerian Dwarf goat farm
