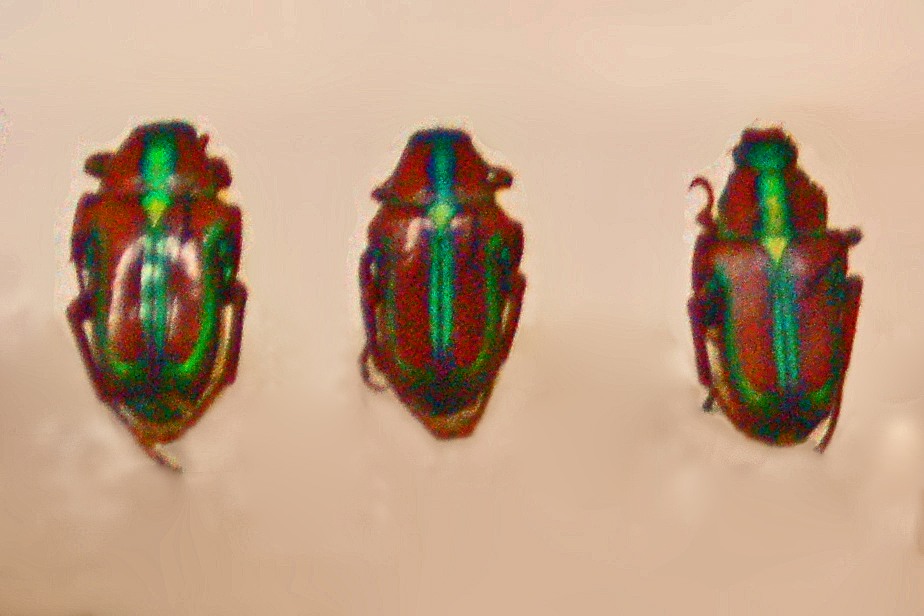
- Pygora lenocinia specimens at the National Museum in Prague

Scientific classification
- Kingdom: Animalia
- Phylum: Arthropoda
- Class: Insecta
- Order: Coleoptera
- Suborder: Polyphaga
- Infraorder: Scarabaeiformia
- Family: Scarabaeidae
- Subfamily: Cetoniinae
- Tribe: Stenotarsiini
- Subtribe: Coptomiina
- Genus: Pygora

Species
- see text

= Pygora beetle =

Genus of beetles

The pygora beetles or flower beetles are scarab beetles of the genus Pygora. They are native to Madagascar.

Species include:

- Pygora albomaculata Kraatz, 1893
- Pygora andranovory Paulian, 1994
- Pygora bella Waterhouse, 1879
- Pygora beryllina Janson 1881
- Pygora bioculata Fairmaire, 1903
- Pygora bourgoini Valck Lucassen, 1930
- Pygora brunneitarsis Moser, 1913
- Pygora conjuncta Gory & Percheron, 1835
- Pygora cowani Waterhouse, 1878
- Pygora cribricollis Fairmaire, 1901
- Pygora cruralis Fairmaire, 1903
- Pygora cultrata Gory & Percheron, 1835
- Pygora cyanea Bourgoin, 1918
- Pygora decorata Janson, 1925
- Pygora descarpentriesi Ruter, 1973
- Pygora diegana Fairmaire, 1903
- Pygora donckieri Bourgoin, 1913
- Pygora earina Bourgoin, 1918
- Pygora erythroderes Blanchard, 1842
- Pygora gerardi Bourgoin, 1924
- Pygora griveaudi Ruter, 1973
- Pygora hirsuta Waterhouse, 1879
- Pygora ignita Westwood, 1879
- Pygora immaculata Fairmaire, 1903
- Pygora lenocinia Gory & Percheron, 1835
- Pygora luctifera Fairmaire, 1899
- Pygora melanura Fairmaire, 1903
- Pygora nigrofasciculata Moser, 1907
- Pygora ornata Janson, 1876
- Pygora perrieri Fairmaire, 1899
- Pygora polyspila Fairmaire, 1903
- Pygora pouillaudei Valck Lucassen 1930
- Pygora prasinella Fairmaire, 1904
- Pygora pulchripes Waterhouse, 1878
- Pygora punctata Janson 1925
- Pygora punctatissima Gory & Percheron, 1835
- Pygora puncticollis Waterhouse, 1879
- Pygora pygidialis Moser 1911
- Pygora pygidialoides Paulian, 1994
- Pygora quatuordecimguttata Kraatz, 1893
- Pygora raharizoninai Paulian, 1994
- Pygora rufoplagiata Westwood, 1879
- Pygora rufovaria Fairmaire, 1903
- Pygora sakarahae Paulian, 1994
- Pygora sanguineomarginata Bourgoin, 1913
- Pygora simillima Moser, 1912
- Pygora tristis Janson, 1925
- Pygora tulearensis Paulian, 1994
- Pygora vadoni Paulian, 1994
- Pygora viridis Valck Lucassen, 1930
- Pygora vohemar Paulian, 1994
- Pygora zombitsy Paulian, 1994
