= Kinder goat =

American breed of goat

Kinder
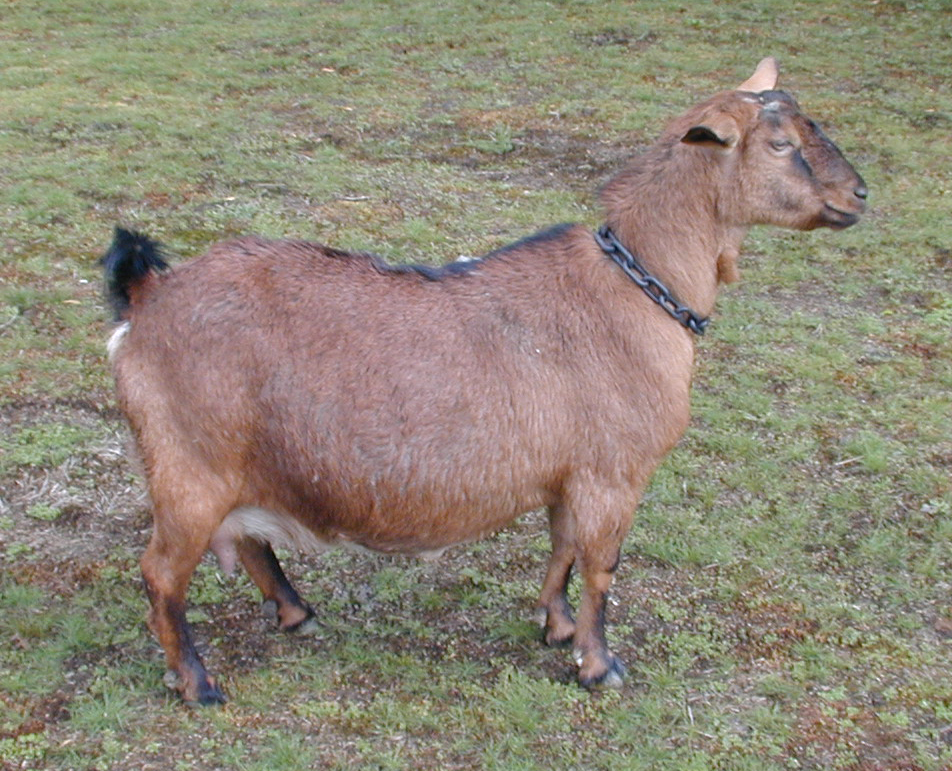
- Conservation status: FAO (2007): endangered; DAD-IS (2020): unknown
- Country of origin: United States
- Standard: Kinder Goat Breeders Association
- Use: milk, meat

Traits
- Weight: Male: 135 lb (61 kg); Female: 115 lb (52 kg)
- Height: Male: 20–28 in (51–71 cm); Female: 20–26 in (51–66 cm)
- Goat; Capra aegagrus hircus

The Kinder is an American breed of domestic goat. It originated on a farm in Snohomish, Washington, where in about 1985 an American Pygmy buck was cross-bred with Nubian does. The resulting stock was selectively bred to create a compact but well-muscled goat, suitable both for milk and for meat production. A herd-book was started in 1988; by 2006 about three thousand head had been registered.

== History ==
The Kinder originated in about 1985 on a farm in Snohomish, Washington, in the north-western United States. There, an American Pygmy buck was cross-bred with Nubian does. The resulting stock was selectively bred to create a compact but well-muscled goat suitable for both goat's milk and goat's meat production. In 1988 a breed society, the Kinder Goat Breeders Association, was established, and a herd-book was started; by 2006 about three thousand head had been registered. The breed has spread within the United States, where it is present in about thirteen states, and also to Brazil and Canada.

The conservation status of the Kinder was listed by the FAO as endangered in 2007; in 2020 DAD-IS listed its status as unknown.

== Characteristics ==
The Kinder is of moderate size, with a sturdy body inherited from the American Pygmy, but with the longer legs of the Nubian. Height at the withers is 20–26 in (51–66 cm) for does and 20–28 in (51–71 cm) for bucks, with weights of about 115 lb (52 kg) and 135 lb (61 kg) respectively. Both sexes are horned, but the breed is commonly disbudded in the United States. The coat is short; the breed standard does not specify any particular coat color.

== Use ==
A Kinder doe may give some 680 kg (1500 lb) of milk in a lactation of about 305 days. The milk is claimed to have an average butterfat content of about 5.5%, occasionally reaching 7%; it is high in milk solids, and is thus suitable for cheese-making.

Like other goat breeds of tropical origin, the Kinder is an aseasonal breeder, and can be bred at any time of the year. It is a highly prolific breed – twin and triplet births are a normal occurrence. The kids put on weight rapidly; the dressed weight after slaughter averages approximately 60%.
