= Pygmy (UK goat breed) =

British breed of goat

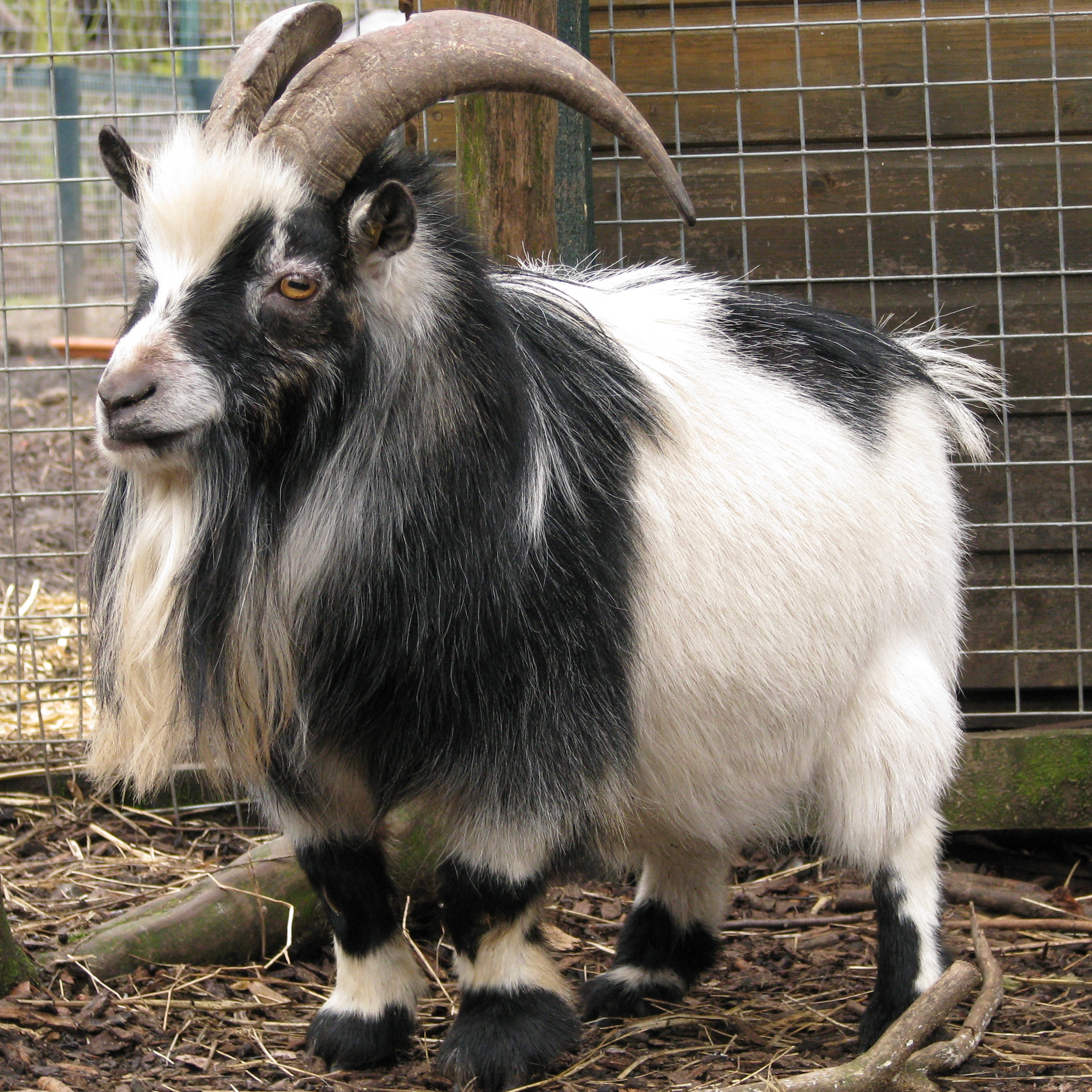
- Billy at Five Sisters Zoo, in West Lothian
- Conservation status: FAO (2007): not listed; DAD-IS (2019): at risk
- Other names: Pygmy Goat
- Country of origin: United Kingdom
- Standard: Pygmy Goat Club

Traits
- Height: 43–56 cm
- Horn status: may be horned in both sexes
- Beard: males heavily bearded
- Goat; Capra aegagrus hircus

The Pygmy is a British breed of dwarf goat. It is small, compact and generally stockily built. It was established in the 1980s by fusion of the various miniature goat populations of the United Kingdom into a single breed. These were of two principal types: a stocky achondroplastic type derived from the West African Dwarf group of breeds of West Africa; and a small but well-proportioned type derived from the Southern Sudan goat.

== History ==
Small goats were brought from Africa to the United Kingdom in the nineteenth century to be exhibited in zoos. Some of these came into the hands of private breeders, who kept and bred them as companion animals. Among these there were two principal types: a broad, short-legged, compact and solid achondroplastic type, often blue roan in colour, derived from the West African Dwarf group of breeds of West Africa; and a small but well-proportioned type derived from the Southern Sudan goat. Regardless of their actual origins, the former was known as the 'Cameroon' and the latter as the 'Nigerian'.

In 1982 the varying types were merged into a single breed. A breed society – the Pygmy Goat Club – was formed, and a herd-book started. The breed society is not among those approved by the Department for Environment, Food and Rural Affairs to operate a herd-book.

In 2018 a population of 2316 head was reported to the DAD-IS breed database of the Food and Agriculture Organization of the United Nations. In 2019 the conservation status of the Pygmy was listed there as "at risk"; it was not on the goat watchlist of the Rare Breeds Survival Trust.

== Use ==
The Pygmy is reared for show or as a companion animal.
