= Kalahari Red =

Breed of goat

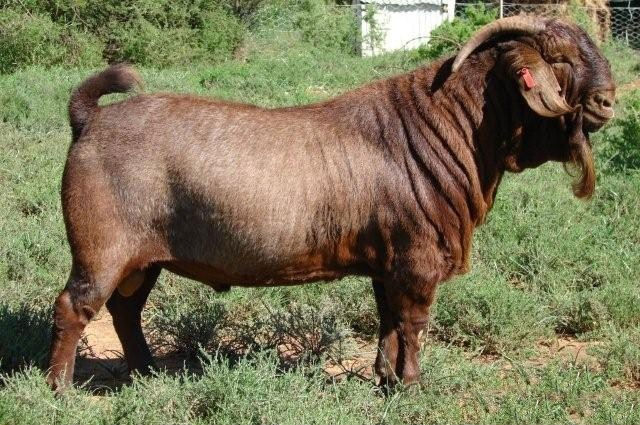
A Kalahari Red buck

The Kalahari Red is a breed of goat originating from South Africa. Their name is derived from their red coat and the Kalahari Desert. They are generally used in meat production. The Kalahari Red goat has adapted to resist their harsh environment, having their red coats as a means of protection against sunlight and naturally built to resist diseases. They are well suited for rangeland affected by woody plant encroachment.
