= Pygora goat =

Goat breed

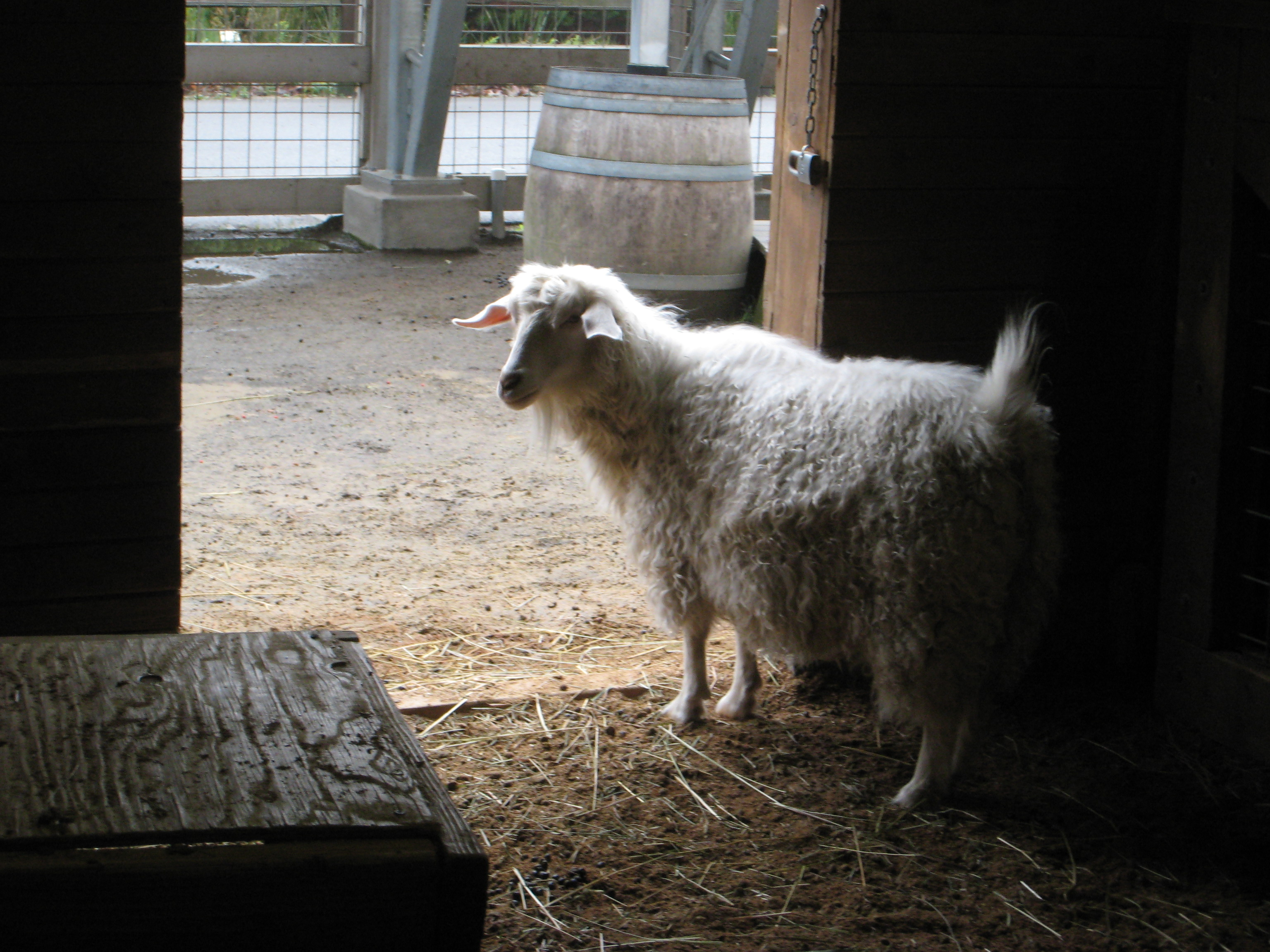
A Pygora at the Oregon Zoo

The Pygora goat is a breed of goat that originated from crossing the registered NPGA Pygmy goat and the white AAGBA Angora goat. Pygoras, along with the Angora goat and Cashmere goat, are fiber goats (goats bred for their wool). Pygora goats produce three distinct kinds of fleece.

== History ==
The Pygora was a purposeful cross, bred by Katharine Jorgensen of Oregon City, Oregon. In 1987, the Pygora Breeders Association was formed in the United States, and has since then been registering and promoting Pygoras. Today, the registered Pygora goat may not be more than 75% AAGBA-registered Angora goat or 75% NPGA-registered Pygmy goat.

== Breed standards ==
First generation (F1) Pygmy-Angora crosses are not considered true Pygoras; however, these may be bred with other Pygora goats, F1 crosses, or back to pure Pygmy or Angora goats to produce true Pygora goats. This may be continued while maintaining the integrity of the breed as long as they have no more than 75% Pygmy or Angora ancestry.

== Characteristics ==
Pygoras live for 12 to 14 years, and are commonly used for fiber, along with being show, breeding, and fiber-producing animals. The weight of a healthy Pygora depends on whether it is a male, female or kid. Most kids are about 5 pounds at birth; does range in weight from 65 to 75 pounds and bucks and wethers range from 75 to 95 pounds. Pygora fiber is frequently used by artists for spinning, spindling, knitting, crocheting, weaving, tapestries, and other fiber arts. It is also commonly used in clothing. Pygoras can also be milked, producing about one liter per day. Pygora wethers generally have higher quality fiber than the does and bucks because they do not spend all their energy producing young. Pygora are mainly for producing fiber, but some people also show them as a hobby, in fairs, fiber shows, and in 4H. Some pygora breeders and 4-H clubs show goats at the Oregon Flock and Fibre Festival (OFFF). Angoras can be found there as well.

Registered Pygora goats will produce cashmere-like fleece (Classified as Type-C), a mohair-like fleece (Type-A), or a combination of the two fleeces (Type-B). Type-A fleece is composed of fibers averaging 6 or more inches in length that drape in ringlets. It may occur as a single coat, but a silky guard hair is usually present. The fibers are typically less than 28 micrometers in diameter. Type-B fleece fibers average between 3 and 6 inches (150 mm) in length with one, possibly two, guard hairs. The fibers are usually less than 24 μm in diameter. Type-C fleece is very fine, typically 1 to 3 inches (76 mm) in length and less than 18.5 μm in diameter. Pygoras come in a variety of colors: white, red, brown, black, gray or a mix of the colors.
