= Angora goat =

Turkish breed of goat

Angora
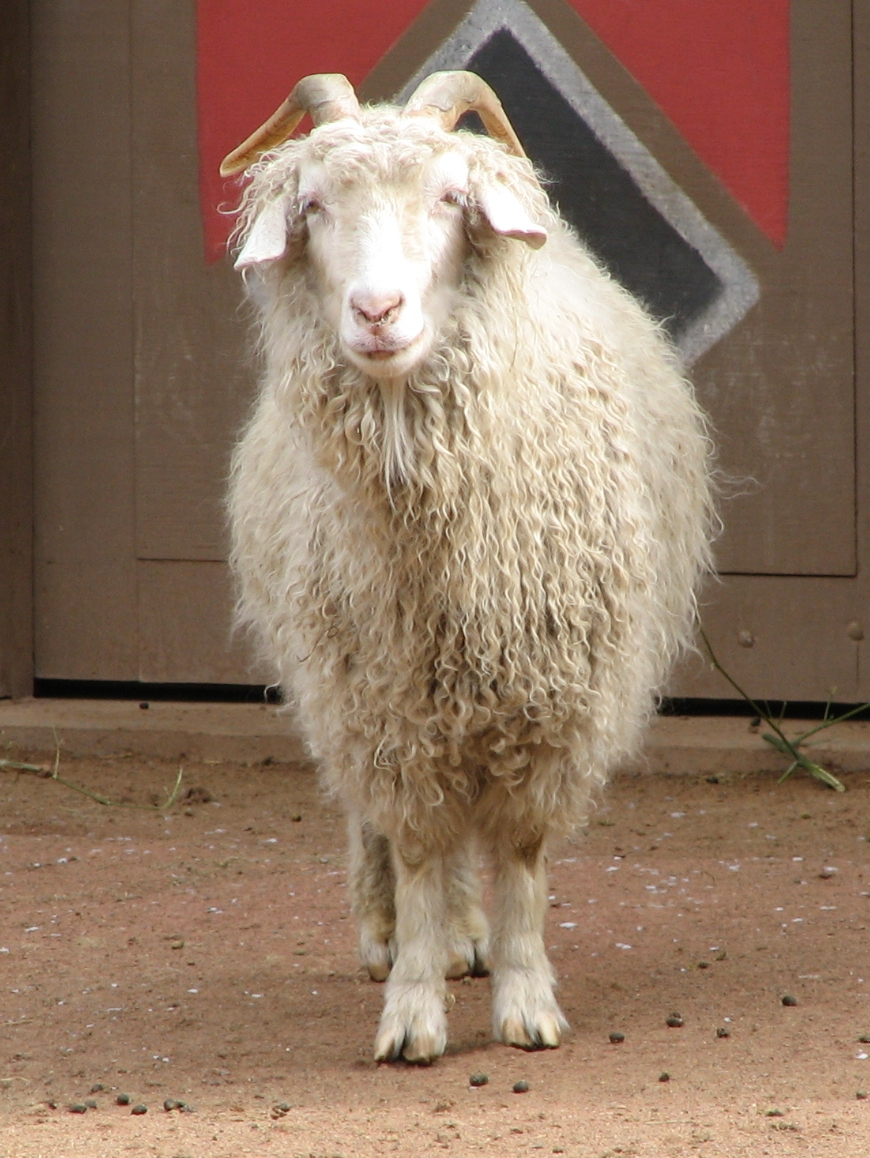
- Conservation status: FAO (2007): not at risk; DAD-IS (2021): not at risk
- Other names: Angora Goat; Ankara Kecisi; Tiftik-Kecisi; Mohair goat; Sybokke (South Africa)
- Country of origin: Turkey
- Distribution: worldwide
- Use: mohair; meat

Traits
- Weight: Male: 45 kg (99 lbs); Female: 35 kg (77 lbs)
- Height: Male: 66 cm; Female: 51 cm
- Wool colour: usually white; also black, brown or grey
- Goat; Capra aegagrus hircus

The Angora or Ankara (Note: Turkish: Ankara Keçisi or Tiftik-Keçisi) is a Turkish breed of domesticated goat. It produces the lustrous fibre known as mohair. It is widespread in many countries of the world. Many breeds derive from it, among them the Indian Mohair, the Soviet Mohair, the Angora-Don of the Russian Federation and the Pygora in the United States.

== History ==
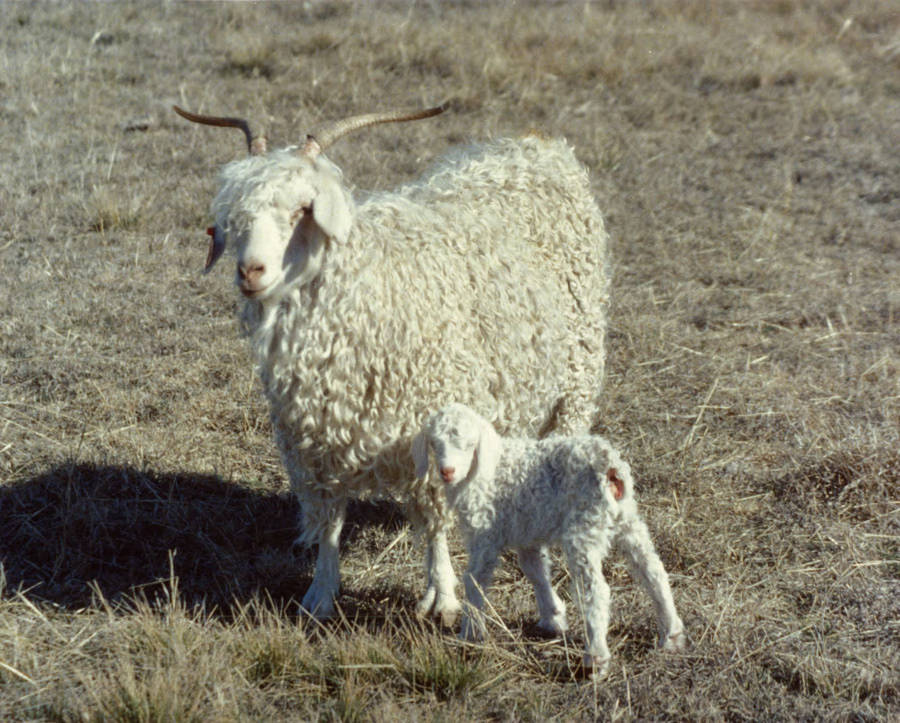
Nanny with kid

The origin of the Angora is currently not known. The earliest Western description may have been published in 1555 by Pierre Belon, who while travelling from Heraclea to Konya in southern Turkey had seen goats with snow-white "... wool so delicate that one would judge it finer than silk ...".

Angora goats were depicted on the reverse of the Turkish 50 lira banknote from 1938 to 1952.

In 1960 there were over 6 million Angora goats in Turkey; the population subsequently dropped sharply. In 2004 the total goat population of the country was approximately 7.2 million; of these, just over 5% were of Angora stock, while the remainder were hair goats. A conservation programme for the Angora was established in 2003.

== Characteristics ==
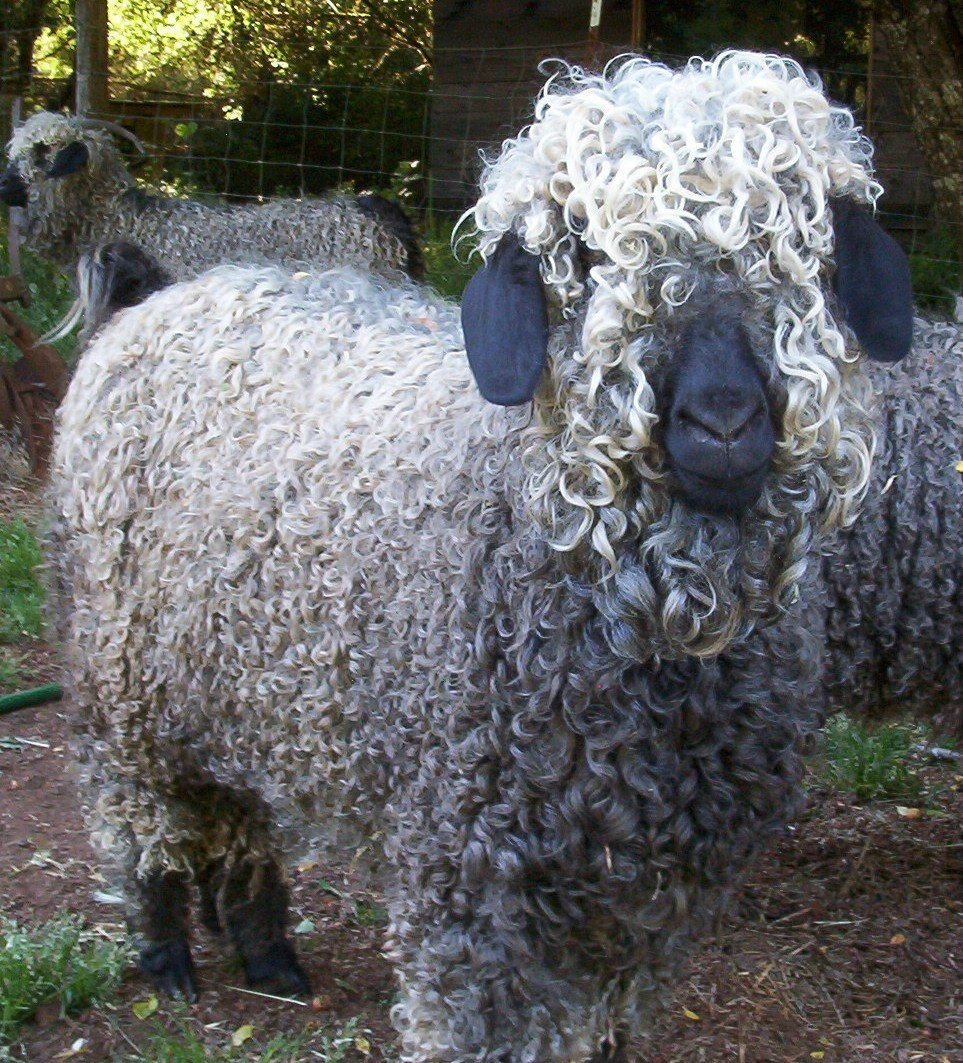
The goats are normally white, but may also be black, brown or grey

The Angora is a moderately small goat, standing about 50 cm at the withers. It is slender, elegant and light-framed; the head is small, with semi-lop ears. It is usually horned; in billies the horns are commonly long, twisted and strong. With the exception of the face and legs, the animal is entirely covered in a coat of long ringlets of fine and lustrous mohair. This goat hair differs from hair seen on other breeds, but the down or undercoat which, in this breed only, grows much longer than the outer hair coat. The face and coat are normally white, but – particularly in southern Turkey – black, brown and grey animals also occur.

== Use ==
The goats are reared either for mohair or for their goat's meat. Mohair is not as fine as cashmere, but yields are much higher. Unlike cashmere, which is obtained by combing the coat of the goat, mohair is obtained by shearing; this is commonly done twice per year. In 2010 approximately half of all mohair production was in South Africa; Argentina and Lesotho were also major producers, followed by the United States, Turkey, Australia and New Zealand.

In some other countries the Angora is reared for its meat, which is succulent and tender, and which in the early twentieth century was described as the best of its kind in the world.

== See also ==
- Angora cat
- Angora rabbit
- Maraz goat
