= List of Chinese goat breeds =

The breeds of domestic goat reported to DAD-IS from China were in 2014:

- Baiyu Black
- Banjiao
- Chaidamu
- Chengde Horn Down
- Chengdu Grey
- Chuandong White
- Daiyun
- Dou'an
- Fengqing Horn Down Black
- Funiu White
- Fuqing
- Ganxi
- Guangfeng
- Guanzhong Dairy
- Guishan
- Guizhou White
- Gulin Grey
- Hexi Cashmere
- Huai
- Huanghuai
- Inner Mongolian Cashmere
- Jianchang Black
- Jining Grey
- Laoshan Dairy
- Leizhou
- Liaoning Cashmere
- Linchang Long-wool
- Longling
- Lubei White
- Luliang Black
- Maguan Horn Down
- Matou
- Nanjiang Grey
- Shaanan White
- Shanbei White Cashmere
- Taihang
- Taihang Mountain Goat
- Taiwan
- Tanner Olsen
- Tibetan
- Wu'an
- Xiangdong Black
- Xinjiang
- Xuhuai
- Ya'an Dairy
- Yanbian Dairy
- Yangste River Delta White
- Yichang White
- Yimeng Black
- Yunling
- Zhaotong
- Zhongwei
- Ziwuling Black
