= Longhai Campaign =

1946 campaign during Chinese Civil War

- Part of the Chinese Civil War
Date	August 10, 1946 – August 22, 1946
Location	Central China
Result	Communist victory

Belligerents
National Revolutionary Army	People's Liberation Army

Commanders and leaders
Xue Yue; Sun Liangcheng	Liu Bocheng; Deng Xiaoping

Strength
165,000	75,000

Casualties and losses
16,000	Unknown

Longhai Campaign (陇海战役), also known as the Campaign along the Longhai (Lanzhou – Lianyungang) Railway (陇海路战役), was a campaign launched against the nationalists by the communists during Chinese Civil War in the post World War II era. The campaign was a coordinated offensive in support of the other two campaigns the Communists launched against the nationalists, namely, the Campaign of the North China Plain Pocket and the Central Jiangsu Campaign. Longhai Campaign resulted in the communist victory, achieving the Communists objective of relieving the pressure on their comrades in the other two campaigns this one supported, enabling those in the Campaign of the North China Plain Pocket to successfully escape from the nationalists and those in the Central Jiangsu Campaign to also score a huge victory over the nationalists.

== Prelude ==
In early August 1946, over a dozen army-sized nationalist (reorganized) divisions were tied down in western Henan and southern Shaanxi in the Campaign of the North China Plain Pocket, and thus causing the offensives against the Communists in other theaters to fail due to insufficient strength. Only three nationalist armies were deployed to guard a vast area covering the region along the section of Longhai (Lanzhou – Lianyungang) Railway from Kaifeng to Xuzhou, and the region to the south of this section bordered by the northern shore of the Yellow River. The Nationalists were not worried, however, because they were ready to deploy additional troops for a preemptive strike to wipe out the Communists in the area. Unbeknownst to the nationalists, the Communists were planning a preemptive strike of their own, before the much greater nationalist reinforcement could be ready, thus forcing the nationalist reinforcement to remain in the region after the campaign, and relieving the pressure faced by the Communists in other campaigns.

== Order of battle ==
Originally, the nationalist had gravely underestimated their enemy and felt that the insufficient force deployed to the region would not be a problem because more troops were already mobilized for a preemptive strike against the enemy, which could not be ready for a large scale battle based on the intelligence. However, the rapid and unexpected development on the battlefield meant otherwise.

=== Nationalist order of battle ===
Units originally stationed in the area and did bulk of the fighting (three armies total):

- 1st Jiangsu Security Column
- Army-sized Reorganized 55th Division
- Army-sized Reorganized 68th Division

Units specifically deployed for this campaign but too late to participate in any major engagements:

- 5th Army
- Army-sized Reorganized 3rd Division
- Army-sized Reorganized 41st Division
- Army-sized Reorganized 47th Division
- Army-sized Reorganized 88th Division
  - Division-sized Newly Organized 21st Brigade
- Army-sized Reorganized 11th Division commanded by Hu Lien
  - Division-sized Reorganized 18th Brigade commanded by Qin Daoshan (覃道善)
  - Division-sized Reorganized 118th Brigade commanded by Gao Kuiyuan (高魁元)

=== Communists order of battle ===
The main thrust of the Communists consisted of two groups:

- Left group:
  - 7th Column of the Shanxi – Hebei – Shandong – Henan Field Army
  - Units from the 3rd Military Sub-region of the Hebei – Shandong – Henan Military region,
  - Independent Brigade of the Hebei – Shandong – Henan Military region
  - Units from the 8th Military Sub-region of the Central China Military Region
- Right group:
- 3rd Column of the Shanxi – Hebei – Shandong – Henan Field Army
- 6th Column of the Shanxi – Hebei – Shandong – Henan Field Army
- Units from the 5th Military Sub-region of the Hebei – Shandong – Henan Military region
- Units from the Eastern Water Military Sub-region

== Strategies ==
Due to overall numerical and technical superiority, the nationalist commander-in-chief of the theater, Xue Yue was confident that he could wipe out the enemy and destroy their bases. In late July 1946, Xue Yue revealed his battle plan to Hu Lien (胡琏), the commander of the army-sized nationalist Reorganized 11th Division in his headquarters in Xuzhou: the main battlefield would be the region to the northwest of Xuzhou, with nationalist troops first attacking northward, eradicating the Communists along the Jinpu railway, thus relieving the besieged nationalist strongholds of Lincheng (临城) and Yanzhou. After the Jinpu railway was secured, it would be used to mobilize nationalist troops to destroy the communist Hebei – Shandong – Henan base in the border region of these three provinces, and this would be the job for the army-sized nationalist Reorganized 11th Division. Meanwhile, other nationalist units were tasked to secure the surrounding regions of Xuzhou by eradicating the Communists in the area.

Nationalists were certain of the success of this plan because the main force of the communist Shanxi – Hebei – Shandong – Henan Field Army was still resting, re-supplying and regrouping in the region between Handan and Daming (大名) on the northern shore of the Yellow River, and only its 7th Column was in the southwestern Shandong on the southern shore of the Yellow River. The bulk of other communist force in Shandong was busy fighting nationalists in northern Jiangsu in the Central Jiangsu Campaign, and the rest was besieging the nationalist strongholds along the Jinpu railway. As the Communists were either tied down or needing more time to recover, nationalists would achieve their victory in a preemptive strike thanks to their mechanized forces. Little did the overly optimistic and overly confident nationalists know that as things developed, this plausible battle plan made before the campaign proved to be impossible to materialize afterward, and eventually, it had to be scrapped completely, because they had gravely underestimated their enemy.

To carry out the communist high command's order of reducing the pressure of communist forces in the Campaign of the North China Plain Pocket and the Central Jiangsu Campaign, Liu Bocheng and Deng Xiaoping decided to launch an offensive against nationalists in the central section of the Longhai (Lanzhou – Lianyungang) Railway, targeting nationalist strongholds between Kaifeng and Xuzhou. Afterward, the Communists would take the region to the south of the railway, destroying the railroad, and thus forcing nationalists to withdraw some of their forces originally deployed in the other two campaigns and redeploying them to face the new threat. The communist force would be grouped into two, with the left group attacking toward the regions of Dang (砀) Mountains and Yellow Mouth (Huangkou, 黄口), and the right group attacking toward the regions of Lanfeng (兰封) and Minquan (民权).

== 1st Stage ==
In the night of 10 August 1946, communist forces including the three columns of the communist Shanxi – Hebei – Shandong – Henan Field Army and some units of the communist Hebei – Shandong – Henan Military region infiltrated the 30 km deep nationalist defense to the north of Longhai (Lanzhou – Lianyungang) Railway in two directions, and launched a surprised attack on the unsuspecting nationalist defenders on a 150 km wide front along the middle section of Longhai (Lanzhou – Lianyungang) Railway that lasted from Lanfeng (兰封) to Yellow Mouth (Huangkou, 黄口). The overconfident defenders had gravely underestimated their enemy, and were completely unaware of the enemy offensive, and consequently, suffered a huge loss. After three days of fierce fighting, regions including Lanfeng (兰封) and Dang (砀) Mountains, plus more than a dozen important railway stations including Li's Hamlet (Lizhuang, 李庄), Poplar Village (Yangji, 杨集), Willow River Village (Liuheji, 柳河集), Wild Chicken Hill (Yejigang, 野鸡岗), Luowang (罗王) fell into the enemy hands. The engineering battalion and the medical battalion of the 18th Brigade of the nationalist Reorganized 11th Division taking of railway stations riding on the train was intercepted near Lanfeng (兰封), and all of the engineering and medical equipment of the division was captured intact by the enemy, along with most of the personnel. Additionally, the nationalists also suffered over five thousand casualties, and over 100 km stretch of railway and its adjacent regions had also fallen into the enemy hands.

Meanwhile, in the night of 10 August 1946, other communist forces including the 7th Column of the communist Shanxi – Hebei – Shandong – Henan Field Army, Units from the 3rd Military Sub-region of the Hebei – Shandong – Henan Military region, the Independent Brigade of the Hebei – Shandong – Henan Military region, and units from the 8th Military Sub-region of the communist Central China Military Region had joined their forces in a coordinated attack on the nationalist strongholds at Yellow Mouth (Huangkou, 黄口) and Dang (砀) Mountains. The nationalist commander of the region, the commander-in-chief of the nationalist 1st Jiangsu Security Column, Sun Liangcheng (孙良诚), was the first nationalist commander to have a real understanding of the scope of the communist attack, and immediately informed his superior, Xue Yue, and asked for reinforcement.

As the local nationalist frontline commander-in-chief Xue Yue learned the news of communist offensive to the west of Xuzhou, he was surprised because it had completely disrupted his original plan of exterminating the Communists and overrunning their bases in the border region of Hebei – Shandong – Henan provinces, and based on his intelligence, it was simply impossible for the enemy to be ready and launch an offensive of this scale in such a short time. Still dubious about the enemy's capability of launching a campaign against the superior nationalist force on this scale, Xue Yue's initial reinforcement plan was mainly geared toward as an eradication campaign with the following troop deployment:

- 1st Jiangsu Security Column was tasked to secure the railway section from Yellow Mouth (Huangkou, 黄口) to Dang (砀) Mountains, and the nationalist strongholds along the section.
- The division-sized Newly Organized 21st Brigade of the army-sized Reorganized 88th Division would advance westward to reinforce Yellow Mouth (Huangkou, 黄口)
- The division-sized 118th Brigade and a brigade-sized regiment of the division-sized 18th Brigade of the army-sized Reorganized 11th Division would arrive Yellow Mouth (Huangkou, 黄口) no later than the dawn of 12 August 1946, and then advance westward from the east along the railway, to eradicate enemy forces around Dang (砀) Mountains.
- The remaining brigade-sized regiments of the division-sized 18th Brigade of the army-sized Reorganized 11th Division, and a brigade-sized regiment of the army-sized Reorganized 55th Division would be deployed to Guide (归德) from Lanfeng (兰封), and then attacking eastward from the west to eradicate enemy forces around Queshan (确山).
- The 5th Army was ordered to regroup in Xiu (宿) County to act as the general reserve.

However, before this battle plan could be fully materialized, the rapid change on the battlefield forced the nationalists to replace the plan with a different one that deployed much more troops in response to the communist threat.

== 2nd Stage ==
On 13 August 1946, the Communists launched their general offensive along the railway, advancing southward. Regions including Ba (把) County and Tongxu (通许) had fallen into communist hands, and the Communists penetrated into the suburbs of Kaifeng, all the way to the city wall, threatening the ancient capital. Under the unexpected pressure, the nationalist garrison of Yu (虞) City totaled more than four thousands defected to the Communists. In a desperate attempt to ask for reinforcement to be sent and arrived promptly, the outnumbered nationalist defenders in the local area gravely exaggerated both their loss and the enemy strength in the messages they sent out. In their urgent appealing for help, the defenders gravely exaggerated their loss to a ridiculously high amount, totaling ninety thousand, a number that was even rejected by the enemy. The city of Kaifeng was claimed to be fallen into the enemy hands at any moment, despite the fact that the enemy themselves never had any plan to even attempt to take the city because they were well aware it was beyond their capability. The city of Kaifeng would remain firmly in the nationalist hands throughout the entire campaign, but due to the lack of communications and chaos of the war, when the news reached the capital, Nanjing, it was erroneously misread as the city had fallen into the enemy hands when the defenders were fighting a fierce street battle in attempts to drive-out the communist advance guards that breached the defense and penetrated into the city. In reality, the defense was strong enough to prevent the enemy from approaching the city wall throughout the campaign. However, the false rumor that was even rejected by the enemy was believed to be true by nationalist politicians and thus a significant portion of the population in the capital in the panic.

Being the 2nd most populous province in China after Sichuan, Henan also had the 2nd highest number of seats in the national congress, and one of the largest immigrant communities in the capital. Nationalists from Henan living in the capital and the Henan representatives in the national congress were shocked by the communist offensive and mobilized quickly into the actions in attempting to pressure the nationalist government to immediately sent reinforcement to the region. In addition to actions in the national congress, the Henan representatives also took other drastic actions of kneeing down in front of government / public buildings, including presidential palace to cry for help, and they were joined by the numerous Henan populace residing in the capital. The political stake was simply too much, just as the pressure was simply too great for the nationalist government to ignore. Additionally, there were several practical reasons that could not be ignored: the 2nd most populous province would provide the enemy an abundant pool of conscripts if it was fallen into the enemy hands in a domino effect after the downfall of Kaifeng. The important strategic location of the province controlled vital transportation / communication lines that were critical to the other theaters of operation, and could not be afforded to be severed. As a result of these combined factors, the nationalist government decided that the original goals in the other two theaters of operation had to be sacrificed and postponed, and thus a nationalist redeployment was ordered. Three army-sized reorganized divisions in the Campaign of the North China Plain Pocket deployed to annihilate Li Xiannian's communist forces, the 3rd, 41st and 47th Reorganized Division were redeployed to rescue Kaifeng. Nationalist units in the Central Jiangsu Campaign were also redeployed for the rescue, including two army-sized reorganized divisions, the 11th and the 88th Reorganized Divisions in Xuzhou and the 5th Army in Huainan. However, such redeployment took time and these units never saw any actions because the campaign had concluded by the time they approached the planned battlefield, but most of these units would be participating in the following Dingtao Campaign.

On 21 August 1946, in the region to the west of Willow River Village (Liuheji, 柳河集), a regiment of the 29th Brigade and the 181st Brigade of the nationalist Reorganized 55th Division was completely destroyed by the Communists. By this time, the nationalist reinforcement in the east had reached the regions of the Dang (砀) Mountains and Xiayi (夏邑), and in the west, the nationalist reinforcement had reached Kaifeng, Xinxiang and Changyuan County, and the Communists decided to end the campaign on 22 August 1946 by retreating to the north of the railway to rest and regroup. Nationalists also ended their operations to recover and rest, and thus the campaign concluded with a communist victory.

== See also ==
- Outline of the Chinese Civil War
- National Revolutionary Army
- History of the People's Liberation Army
