= Jining Grey =

Breed of goat

Jining Grey is a goat breed from the Shandong Province of China, used for the production of its kid pelt and cashmere fiber.

== See also ==
- Cashmere goat

== Sources ==
- Jining Grey Goat
