= Cashmere goat =

Any breed of goat that produces cashmere wool

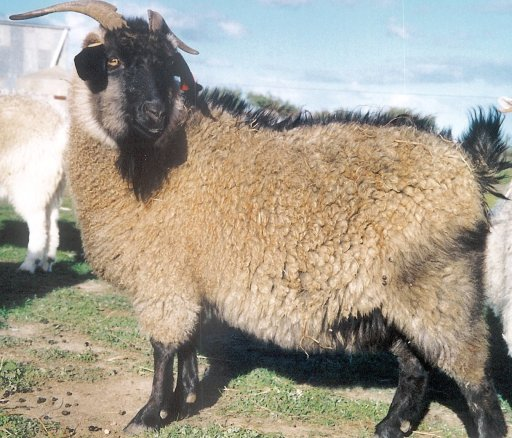
An Australian cashmere goat

A cashmere goat is a type of goat that produces cashmere wool, the goat's fine, soft, downy, winter undercoat, in commercial quality and quantity. This undercoat grows as the days get shorter and is associated with an outer coat of coarse hair, which is present all the year and is called guard hair. Most common goat breeds, including dairy goats, grow this two-coated fleece but cashmere breeds have been selected for quality and quantity of their undercoat.

The down is produced by secondary follicles, the guard hair by the primary follicles.

In 1994, China had an estimated population of 123 million goats and is the largest producer of cashmere down. Local breeds are dominant. In the past decades, breeding programs have been started to develop productive breeds. The cashmere goat is a fiber goat along with the Pygora goat, Nigora goat, and the Angora goat.

The goats take their name from their origin in the Himalayan region of Kashmir with the word "cashmere" deriving from an anglicisation of Kashmir.

== Cashmere-producing breeds ==
=== Australian cashmere goat ===
The foundation stock for the Australian Cashmere Goat was taken from northern and western Australia from the local bush goat population in the late 1970s. The production varies from herd to herd, with the most productive herds averaging 250 grams at a diameter of 15 μm. There is a breed and fleece standard, and active development of the breed continues with the University of Western Australia running a sire referencing scheme.

=== Changthangi (Kashmir Pashmina) cashmere goat ===
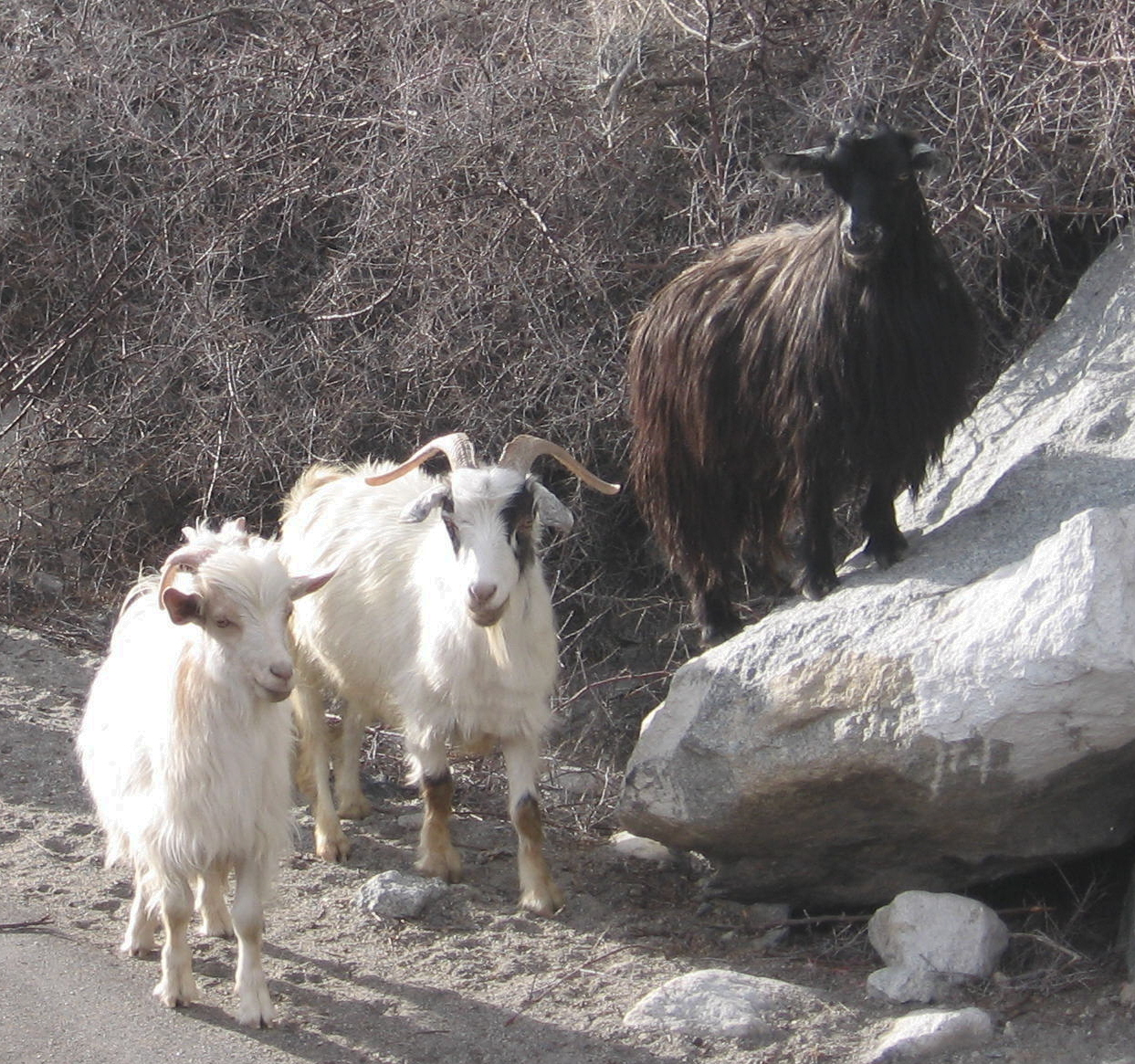
Pashmina goats, Ladakh (India)

The Changthangi or Pashmina goat is found in China (Tibet), Mongolia, Myanmar, Bhutan, Nepal, Pakistan and India. They are raised for cashmere production and used as pack animals. The breed is most often white, but black, gray and brown animals also occur. They have large, twisting horns. This bloodline produces the finest Cashmere with an average diameter between 12 and 13 μm and average fiber length between 55-60mm. It is very rare and constitutes less than 0.1% of global cashmere production.

=== Hexi ===
The Hexi Cashmere has a long history in desert and semidesert regions of Gansu Province, China. About 60% of the goats are white. The Hexi cashmere can be found in the Gansu, Qinghai and Ningxia provinces. A typical adult doe produces 184 grams of down at 15.7 μm diameter.

=== Inner Mongolia cashmere goat ===
The Inner Mongolia cashmere goat is a local dual-purpose breed with a long history. It adapts well to desert and semidesert pastures. The goats can be divided into five strains, Alasan (Alashanzuoqi), Arbus, Erlangshan, Hanshan and Wuzhumuqin. The first three strains produce quality cashmere; the last two have been developed for high production. The average down yield is about 240 grams, with an average down diameter between 14.3 and 15.8 μm. The cashmere length is between 41 and 47 mm. In 1994, the total Inner Mongolian goat population was approximately 2.3 million goats.

=== Liaoning cashmere goat ===
Breeding animals were selected in the 1960s from six counties in the eastern mountain area of Liaoning Province. The herd has been continually developed since then, and used to improve the cashmere herd throughout China. The Liaoning goat is mainly found in the Buyun mountains in the Liaodong Peninsula. The breed was formally named the Liaoning cashmere goat by the Chinese Ministry of Agriculture in 1984. By 1994, selected Liaoning does were producing 326 g of down at 15 μm diameter. The selection work emphasizes size, length of body, quantity and quality of cashmere, the ability to climb, sturdiness, conformation and growth.

=== Licheng Daqing goat ===
The Licheng Daqing goat is a dual-purpose breed from the Shanxi Province, China. The down is usually brown, but the color can vary. The average doe down yield is 115 g at 14 μm diameter.

=== Luliang black goat ===
This dual-purpose goat is found in the Lüliang area; it produces a small quantity of dark soft down.

=== Tibetan Plateau goat ===
In 1994, there were more than 7 million Tibetan Plateau and Valley goats in Tibetan Plateau regions of People's Republic of China. Five million were in Tibet Autonomous Region, 1 million in Tibetan Autonomous Prefectures in Sichuan, half a million in Qinghai and about 100,000 in Gansu. There are also a small number of Tibetan goats in India and Nepal. The Tibetan plateau goats are kept for down production. In 1994, an adult doe's average down production was 197 g, while the average adult buck's down production was 261 g.

=== Wuzhumuqin ===
This Inner Mongolian strain is a new breed, recognized in 1994, and is distributed mainly in Xilingele Meng. The development of the breed started in 1980. By 1994, the breed had 372 nucleus herds and 681 selection herds. The bucks have thick, long horns and 85% of the does are horned. Ninety eight percent of the herd is white. The developers of the breed claim the lustre of the fleece is better than the Liaoning goat. The average production of a Wuzhumuqin adult does in 1994 was 285 g at 15.6 μm diameter; the average down length was 46 mm.

=== Zalaa Jinst White goat ===
The Zalaa Jinst White goat is the only entirely white breed of cashmere goat in Mongolia recognized by the Mongolian Wool & Cashmere Association, found in the southwest region of the Gobi Desert, where it has adapted well to Gobi desert nomadic herding. The average cashmere production for males is 380 grams; adult female is 290 grams with fibers averaging 16.0-16.5 microns in diameter

=== Zhongwei cashmere goats ===
The Zhongwei goat originated in the semidesert and desert area around Zhongwei in Ningxia and Gansu Provinces in China, and are famous for their kid fur and cashmere production. The average fiber production for does is 216 g at 15 μm diameter.

== See also ==
- William Windsor (goat)
