= Dingtao Campaign =

1946 military campaign

- Part of the Chinese Civil War
Date	September 2, 1946 – September 8, 1946
Location	Shandong, China
Result	Communist victory

Belligerents
National Revolutionary Army	People's Liberation Army

Commanders and leaders
Liu Zhi; Xue Yue	Liu Bocheng; Deng Xiaoping

Strength
140,000+	70,000+

Casualties and losses
5,000 killed 12,000 captured	3,500 total

Dingtao Campaign (定陶战役) was a series of battles fought between the nationalists and the communists during Chinese Civil War in the post World War II era, and resulted in the communist victory.

== Prelude ==
After the defeat of Longhai Campaign, the original nationalist plan of completely annihilating Li Xiannian's communist force in the North China Plain pocket was disrupted and the scheduled completion had to be postponed due to the need to redeploy nationalist forces to eradicate communist forces under the command of Liu Bocheng and Deng Xiaoping in southwestern Shandong. The nationalists concluded that the overwhelming numerical and technical superiorities over Li Xiannian's communist force in the North China Plain pocket was sufficient to withstand a troop reduction, so three army-sized reorganized divisions originally deployed in southern Shaanxi and western Henan were redeployed to the region where Dingtao Campaign was about to take place. Additionally, two army-sized divisions from Xuzhou and another army from Huainan were also redeployed to the region. The eight army-sized nationalist reorganized divisions already stationed here in the regions of Zhengzhou, Xinxiang, and Shangqiu were reinforced by these additional six units, totaling more than three hundred thousand troops, and the nationalists were confident that the enemy would be annihilated quickly and their bases overran.

== Order of battle ==
Although the total strength of the nationalist in the region exceeded over three hundred thousand, only half of the total force was deployed for the Dingtao Campaign, the nationalist commanders obviously felt that this was enough since it was already twice the size of the troops enemy could field, not mentioning the technical superiority the nationalists enjoyed. This miscalculation provided the numerical and technical inferior enemy an opportunity to concentrate its forces locally, achieving local superiority over the nationalists in the area where the campaign was fought, thus achieving the final victory.

=== Nationalist order of battle ===
The nationalist units deployed for Dingtao Campaign included seven armies:

- Army-sized Reorganized 3rd Division
  - Division-sized (Reorganized) Headquarters Brigade
  - Division-sized Reorganized 3rd Brigade
  - Division-sized Reorganized 20th Brigade
- Army-sized Reorganized 41st Division
- Army-sized Reorganized 47th Division
- Army-sized Reorganized 55th Division
- Army-sized Reorganized 68th Division
- 5th Army
- Temporarily Organized 4th Column

=== Communist order of battle ===
Communist forces deployed for the campaign included fifty thousand troops from the four columns of the communist field army, and another twenty thousand local garrisons.

- 2nd Column of the Shanxi – Hebei– Shandong – Henan Field Army
- 3rd Column of the Shanxi – Hebei– Shandong – Henan Field Army
- 6th Column of the Shanxi – Hebei– Shandong – Henan Field Army
- 7th Column of the Shanxi – Hebei– Shandong – Henan Field Army
- Units from the 5th Military Sub-region of the Hebei – Shandong – Henan Military region
- Units from the 3rd Military Sub-region of the Hebei – Shandong – Henan Military region
- Independent 4th Brigade of the Southern Hebei Military Region
- Independent Brigade of the Hebei – Shandong – Henan Military Region

== Strategies ==
The strategies of both sides had changed as the campaign progressed, with the original nationalist plan being at least adequate if not flawless, and even their enemy had concurred for that the plan had posed a serious threat to them. However, the deviation of the original plan by the nationalists due to overconfidence caused the enemy to exploit the weakness of the change and thus lead to the eventual nationalist defeat.

=== Nationalist strategy ===
The nationalist plan was simple and direct. They planned to use their numerical and technical superiority to annihilate the Communist forces under the command of Liu Bocheng and Deng Xiaoping in the regions of Dingtao (定陶) and Cao (曹) County, to the north of Lanzhou – Lianyungang Railway, and after the total annihilation of the enemy, the enemy base in southwestern Shandong would be overrun, and the nationalists would restore the vital transportation and communication line of Beijing–Hankou Railway. To achieve this goal, the defense minister Bai Chongxi and the chief of the general staff Chen Cheng were sent to Kaifeng to oversee the operation, and Liu Zhi was named as the frontline commander-in-chief, and was sent to the Kaocheng (考城) – Minquan (民权) frontline to command.

Zhengzhou front:

- A brigade from the Reorganized 55th Division and another from the Reorganized 68th Division would attack Cao (曹) County from the region from Lanfeng (兰封) to Shangqiu, with the help of a regiment from the Temporarily Organized 4th Column.
- Reorganized 41st Division would attack Dongming (东明) from Fengqiu (封丘).
- Reorganized 3rd and 47th Divisions would attack Dingtao (定陶) from Fengqiu (封丘) in a pincer movement.

Xuzhou front:

- The 5th Army, Reorganized 11th and 88th Division would advance toward regions including Yutai (鱼台), Feng (丰) County, and Chengwu (城武), from the regions including Yu (虞) City and Xuzhou.

Other forces deployed:

- Four brigades and two security regiments were tasked to secure the Kaifeng–Shangqiu section of the Lanzhou–Lianyungang Railway.
- General reserves included 13 brigades in the region of Anyang, Xinxiang and the region to the east of these two prefectures.

The main thrust would be that of Zhengzhou front.

=== Communist strategy ===
Troops of communist 3rd, 6th and 7th Columns under the command of Liu Bocheng and Deng Xiaoping was resting, re-supplying and regrouping in the southwestern Shandong after the communist victory of Longhai Campaign at the time. Due to the overwhelming nationalist numerical and technical superiorities, the communist central military committee, the communist high command, radioed the local communists to instruct them to concentrate their force in each battle to achieve at least 3:1 superiority, and 4:1 was even better when fighting the nationalist regular forces. After destroying a portion of the nationalist force, then targeting the next and so on, accumulate many smaller victories into an eventual large one. Liu Bocheng and Deng Xiaoping analyzed their positions and concluded that a communist victory could be secured due to the following reasons. Despite the absolute numerical and technical superiority, the nationalists only had fifteen brigades devoted to the actual attacks on the frontline, and this strength would be further reduced if the nationalists advance further. Although two armies out of the top five crack nationalist units were deployed in the nationalist thrust from Xuzhou, it actually was not the main thrust. Instead, the nationalist thrust from Zhengzhou was the true thrust against the communist bases, but among the nationalist forces deployed for this thrust, only the nationalist Reorganized 3rd and 47th Divisions were truly capable. If one of these reorganized division (possibly two) were annihilated, the nationalist thrust from Zhengzhou would be effectively neutralized. With the main thrust gone, the other nationalist thrust from Xuzhou against the communists would not last long either, and the nationalist offensive would be crushed.

Therefore, communists decided to reinforce their local strength by redeploying the communist 2nd Column to the local Dingtao (定陶) region from northern Henan. A total of four communist columns and additional local garrisons totaling around fifty thousand troops would achieve numerical superiority four times over planned targets, the Reorganized 3rd and 20th Brigades of the nationalist Reorganized 3rd Division. After the two nationalist reorganized brigades had been annihilated in the region of Han's Village (Hanji, 韩集), its remaining brigade and the nationalist Reorganized 47th Division would then be attack and annihilated when the situation allowed. The communist commanders consequently made their following plan:

- A total of ten brigades would be gathered in the region to the west of Dingtao (定陶) to ambush and annihilate the nationalist Reorganized 3rd Division.
  - The right group would be consisted of communist 2nd Column (without its 4th Brigade) and 6th Column (without two regiments), totaling five brigades.
  - The left group would be consisted of communist 3rd Column (without its 9th Brigade) and 7th Column, totaling five brigades.
- Two regiments of the communist 6th Column were tasked to lure the nationalist Reorganized 3rd Division to the site of the planned ambush.
- The bulk of communist force of the 5th Military Sub-region of the communist Hebei – Shandong – Henan Military region and a single regiment of the 9th Brigade of the communist 3rd Column were tasked to check the advance of the nationalist Reorganized 47th Division, so that the gap between the nationalist Reorganized 3rd and 47th Division would be further increased.
- Two regiments of the 9th Brigade of the communist 3rd Column a regiment of the 5th Military Sub-region of the communist Hebei – Shandong – Henan Military region were tasked to check the advance of the nationalist Reorganized 55th and 68th Divisions in the region to the south of Cao (曹) County.
- The Independent 4th Brigade of the communist Southern Hebei Military Region was tasked to check the advance of the nationalist 41st Division.
- The Independent Brigade of the communist Hebei – Shandong – Henan Military Region and the troops of the communist 3rd Military Sub-region were tasked to block the nationalist 5th Army in the region of Chengwu (城武).

== 1st Stage ==
On 2 September 1946, after suffering over fifteen hundred casualties, the nationalist Reorganized 3rd Division succeeded in taking Qinzhai (秦砦) and Peach Garden (Taoyuan 桃园) regions after driving out the two regiments of the communist 6th Column stationed there. Meanwhile, the nationalist Reorganized 47th Division advanced to the regions of Luzhai (吕砦) and Yellow Water Mouth (Huangshuikou, 黄水口). The relatively rapid advance caused the nationalist commanders to become overconfident, and Liu Zhi, the nationalist frontline commander-in-chief altered the original plan of taking Dingtao (定陶) by a joint attack by the nationalist Reorganized 3rd and 47th Divisions. Liu split his force by ordering the nationalist Reorganized 3rd Division to take Heze and the nationalist Reorganized 47th Division to take Dingtao (定陶) by itself. As a result, the gap between the two divisions was increased to 10 to 12.5 km from the original 7.5 to 10 km. The rest of nationalist units was 40 to 100 km away from the two divisions, and they were respectively blocked by the enemy in the regions to the southeast of Dongming (东明), south of Cao (曹) County, east of Dan (单) County and Chengwu (城武).

Liu Bocheng and Deng Xiaoping immediately decided to adjust their plans accordingly to the change of the nationalist plan. The communists reasoned that the nationalist thrusts from Zhengzhou and Xuzhou had not linked up yet, but the gaps between the nationalist Reorganized 3rd and 47th Divisions was increasing, it would be wise to allow the nationalist Reorganized 3rd Division to advance further, thus isolating itself from the rest of nationalist units, hence becoming a good target for annihilation. The planned site of ambush was moved westward to Greater Poplar Lake (Dayanghu, 大杨湖) region from the original Han's Village (Hanji, 韩集), and once the nationalist division, it would be attacked from both the left and the right. The bulk of the communist group on the right would thrust southward, and the remaining portion would thrust to the eastward from the west. The communist group on the left would first thrust into the gap between the nationalist Reorganized 3rd and 47th Divisions, and then with the bulk of its force attacking northward from the south to coordinate the attack with their comrades in the north, while the remaining force of the communist right group would check the advance of the nationalist Reorganized 47th Division to prevent it from reinforcing the nationalist Reorganized 3rd Division.

In the afternoon of 3 September 1946, the nationalist Reorganized 47th Division had advanced to the region to the south of Three Hills Hotel (Sanqiudian, 三丘店) and Usual Road Village (Changluji, 常路集). Meanwhile, the 3rd Brigade of the nationalist Reorganized 3rd Division advanced to the Rheum officinale Market (Dahuangji, 大黄集) region, the headquarters brigade of the nationalist Reorganized 3rd Division advanced to the Celestial Grandpa Temple (Tianyemiao, 天爷庙) region, and the 20th Brigade of the nationalist Reorganized 3rd Division advanced to the Greater Poplar Lake (Dayanghu, 大杨湖) region. At 11:30 PM, the two communist groups on the left and on the right suddenly simultaneously attacked, concentrated on the 20th Brigade of the nationalist Reorganized 3rd Division, but the nationalists put up a gallant fight, and with the help of armor and air support, the initial communist attack was successfully thrown back by the next day, with communists only able to destroy three battalions of the besieged nationalist division.

== 2nd Stage ==
Zhao Xitian (赵锡田), the commander of the nationalist Reorganized 3rd Division realized that his division was surrounded by the enemy and radioed for help, and Liu Zhi ordered all units to immediately push toward the besieged division for the rescue. From September 4 thru 5 September 1946, nationalist Reorganized 47th Division attempted to reinforce their besieged comrades-in-arms from the south, but their advance was firmly checked by the communist 3rd Column in the region of Peach Garden (Taoyuan 桃园). Other nationalist divisions were also stopped by the stubborn enemy resistance and thus could not reach the besieged nationalist Reorganized 3rd Division.

On 5 September 1946, the communists launched their general assault on the besieged nationalist Reorganized 3rd Division. By the morning of 6 September 1946, the nationalist Reorganized 20th Brigade was completely annihilated in the region of Greater Poplar Lake (Dayanghu, 大杨湖), while the nationalist Reorganized 3rd Brigade was badly mauled in the region of Greater Poplar Lake (Xiaoyanghu, 小杨湖). By noon, the remnant of the nationalist Reorganized 3rd Brigade finally linked up with the surviving headquarters brigade of the nationalist Reorganized 3rd Division, and the surviving nationalists attempted to breakout southward. However, the survivors of the nationalist Reorganized 3rd Division were completely annihilated by the waiting communists in the Qinzhai (秦砦) region, and their commander Zhao Xitian (赵锡田) was captured alive by the enemy.

After the nationalist Reorganized 3rd Division was completely annihilated, other overstretched and tired nationalist forces which was short on supply immediately retreated toward Kaocheng (考城) and Lanfeng (兰封). Seizing the opportunity, the communists gave chase and the nationalist Reorganized 47th Division which was closest to the enemy became the first victim, with its flank being attacked from the rear. After a fierce battle that lasted an entire day, two brigades (division-sized) were lost. At the same time, the retreating nationalist Reorganized 41st, 55th, and 68th Divisions were also chased by the enemy, each losing a battalion respectively when the campaign concluded in the morning of 8 September 1946. Although nationalists attempted to send more troops from Xuzhou to reinforce their comrades-in-arms in Zhengzhou, they advance were firmed checked by the stubborn enemy in Chengwu (城武) region for the entire duration of the campaign.

== Outcome ==
The nationalists suffered over seventeen thousand losses, including five thousand fatalities and another twelve thousand being captured by the enemy. In addition, communists also captured six tanks and large amount of supplies from the nationalists. Another benefit for the communists brought by their victory of the campaign was that it relieved the pressure of communists elsewhere as the campaign had forced the nationalist to withdraw some of their units deployed in the Campaign of the North China Plain Pocket originally planned to encircle communists force under the command of Li Xiannian, who eventually led his force to escape successfully from the nationalists.

The reason for the nationalist defeat was due to their overconfidence for that they enjoyed both the numerical and technical advantages. However, as the nationalists pushed deep inside the enemy territory, their force were split and thus they no longer enjoyed local numerical superiority despite having overall absolute superiority in the entire front. This opportunity was exploited by the enemy who concentrated their force to achieve local numerical superiority and successfully annihilated the attacking nationalist division that was relatively isolated for venturing too far away from other nationalist units. According to Chinese communists, along with the Campaign of the North China Plain Pocket and the Central Jiangsu Campaign, Dingtao Campaign was one of these three critical campaigns that helped to stabilize the southern front for the communist in the initial stage of the Chinese Civil War in the post World War II era.

== See also ==
- Outline of the Chinese Civil War
- National Revolutionary Army
- History of the People's Liberation Army
- Chinese Civil War
