= Campaign in the Eastern Foothills of the Funiu Mountains =

1947 military campaign

- Part of Chinese Civil War
| Date | October 29, 1947 – November 25, 1947 |
| Location | Western Honan, China |
| Result | Communist victory |

Belligerents
| National Revolutionary Army | People's Liberation Army |

Commanders and leaders
| unknown | Chen Geng; Xie Fuzhi |

Strength
| 60,000 | 60,000 |

Casualties and losses
| 12,000 | Unknown |

The Campaign in the Eastern Foothills of the Funiu Mountains (伏牛山东麓战役) was a series of battles fought between the nationalists and the communists during the Chinese Civil War after World War II for the control of western Hubei and the border areas of Hubei, Honan and Shensi provinces. The campaign resulted in the communist victory.

== Prelude ==
In mid October 1947, the nationalists had gathered forces included the V Corps centered at Luoyang at the east, and the Reorganized 1st Division and the Reorganized 36th Division at Tongguan County at the west for the preparation to reopen the Longhai railway transportation / communication line by first surrounding and then annihilating the communist force led by commander Chen Geng (陈赓) and political commissar Xie Fuzhi. On October 20, 1947, the communist high command ordered Chen Geng (陈赓) and Xie Fuzhi to split their force into three: one part would remain along the railroad to distract the enemy, and the other would strike southern Shaanxi. The third part, the main force, should cross the railroad to push southward, and would strike regions included Nanzhao (南召), Wuyang (舞阳), and Fangcheng (方城) in western Hubei to establish new bases. To carry out this strategy, Chen Geng (陈赓) and Xie Fuzhi decided to launch the Campaign in the Eastern Foothills of the Funiu Mountains.

== Order of battle ==
Both sides were equally matched in terms of numbers, but the nationalists enjoyed significant technical advantage in terms of weaponry.

- Nationalist order of battle: 9 divisions total
  - The Reorganized 1st Division
  - The Reorganized 3rd Division
  - The Reorganized 10th Division
  - The Reorganized 15th Division
  - The 20th Division
  - The Reorganized 36th Division
  - The Reorganized 41st Division
  - The 206th Division
  - Local security brigades and regiments
- Communist order of battle: 9 divisions total
  - The 4th Column
  - The 9th Column
  - The 38th Army

== First stage ==
The campaign started on October 29, 1947, with the communist 55th Division of the 38th Army deployed along the Longhai Railroad to tie down the nationalist forces, and the rest units of the communist 38th Army and the 12th Brigade of the communist 4th Column struck toward southern Shaanxi. The rest units of the communist 4th Column and the communist 9th Column struck the nationalist controlled regions in multiple fronts. From November 1, 1947, to November 4, 1947, Linru (临汝), Jia (郏) County, Dengfeng (登封), Lushan (鲁山), and Baofeng (宝丰) fell into the communist hands. The nationalist Reorganized 15th Division guarding these regions suffered greatly in the process, with more than 2,500 killed in the battle of Jia (郏) County alone on November 4, 1947. The nationalists were forced to redeploy by dispatching the Reorganized 3rd Division and the 20th Division toward Baofeng (宝丰) and Jia (郏) County, the 124th Brigade of the nationalist Reorganized 41st Division toward Linru (临汝), and the 125th Brigade of the nationalist Reorganized 41st Division toward Xiang City (Xiang Cheng, 襄城) in hope of luring the communists out to fight a decisive battle. However, the enemy would not take the bait and instead, took advantage of the nationalist redeployment by striking regions where nationalist defense was weakened by the redeployment.

On November 3, 1947, the communist 27th Brigade of the 9th Column besieged the town of Nanzhao (南召), and launched the assault on the town at 1:00 AM on November 4, 1947. The strongest fortification at the Eastern Pass (Dong Guan, 东关) was blown up and attacking enemy subsequently penetrated into the town and annihilated most of the nationalist garrison consisted of two battalions. As the survivors attempted to flee via the western gate, they were ambushed by the waiting enemy and the entire 500 strong nationalist garrison was thus completely wiped out. After taking the town, the communists opened up the nationalist food depot and treasury to distribute food and money to the local populace, most of which was in severe poverty, and thus completely won over the local popular support. On November 5, 1947, the 75th Regiment of the 25th Brigade of the communist 9th Column reached the outskirt of the Square City (Fang Cheng, 方城). Although the nationalists had built many fortifications both inside and outside the town, the local nationalist commander Wang Jingxiu (王敬修) was well aware that his four-regiments strong security brigade was not a match for the enemy, and in order to avoid annihilation, the nationalist garrison wisely abandoned the town without a fight, thus successfully retreated before the enemy besieged the town. After entering the town, the communist force with strict discipline discredited the negative nationalist propaganda about the communists and consequently, the local popular support drastically switched to the communist side.

The initial communist success was totally unexpected by the nationalists, who was completely shocked by the rapid territorial expansion of the enemy. Chiang Kai-shek immediately ordered the commander-in-chief of the 5th Corps Li Tiejun (李铁军) to personally lead the nationalist Reorganized 3rd Division and the 20th Division totaling seven brigades to pursuit the communists for the subsequent elimination. The communists held a conference in the town of Nanzhao (南召) on November 8, 1947, and decided not to engage the technically superior nationalist adversary. Instead, the nationalists would be lured into the Funiu Mountains and tricked into dispersing themselves into smaller fragments first, and then when the situation allowed, the communists would annihilate these small fragments one by one. While some communist units would fake as the main force to lure the nationalists into the mountains, the actual main force would take advantage of the overstretched nationalist defense by establishing new communist bases in the remote and rural regions.

== Second stage ==
The communist 13th Brigade of the 4th Column and the 25th Brigade of the 9th Column under the political commissar Huang Zhen (黄镇) and the deputy commander-in-chief Huang Xiyou (黄新友, unrelated to the political commissar Huang Zhen 黄镇) of the communist 9th Column had successfully tricked the nationalists in believing that they were the main communist force by faking as a much larger force on their attack toward Zhenping (镇平), Internal Township (Nei Xiang, 内乡) and Western Gorge Entrance (Xi Xia Kou, 西峡口) regions. The nationalists were tricked to deploy the 3rd Reorganized Division and the 125th Brigade of the 41st Division to pursuit the fake enemy main force, and after wasting more than half a month at Summer Hotel (Xia Guang, 夏馆) and (Xi Xia Kou, 西峡口) regions, the nationalist force not only failed to annihilate the enemy, but was also incapable of stopping the enemy from cutting the communication / transportation line between (Xi Xia Kou, 西峡口) and Jingzi Pass (Jing Zi Guang, 荆紫关). The enemy had planned to lure the nationalists into the Funiu Mountains and then annihilate them in ambushes when the opportunity presented itself, but due to the lack of supplies, the nationalists was forced to withdraw and thus escaped unscratched. The enemy did, however, successfully establish two new bases in the regions: the sixth military district by the communist 39th Regiment of the 13th Brigade in the region of Li Qing's Hotel (Li Qing Dian, 李青店) of Nanzhao (南召) county, under the command of the deputy commander of the communist 13th Brigade, Li Xifu (黎锡福), and the seventh military district by the communist 33rd Regiment of the 11th Brigade under the command of the political commissar of the 11th Brigade, Hu Rungui (胡荣贵). Meanwhile, the main force of the communist 9th Column and the 22nd Brigade of the communist 4th Column threatened Luoyang by penetrating into the vicinity of the city, forcing the nationalist 206th Division to be redeployed to strengthen the defensive of the city. The 10th Brigade and the 11th Brigade of the communist 4th Column penetrated into regions of Wuyang (舞阳), Square City (Fang Cheng, 方城), and Miyang (泌阳), forcing the nationalist Reorganized 10th Division and the 124th Brigade of the nationalist Reorganized 41st Division to be redeployed to east of Beijing-Hankou railroad.

In order to take the initiative by luring the nationalists to overstretch themselves, the newly taken towns of Square City (Fang Cheng, 方城) and Nanzhao (南召) were intentionally abandoned by the communists, and the nationalists subsequently fell for the trick by ordering Song Kezun (宋可尊), the nationalist chief-of-staff of the sixth regional security command of Henan to reenter the Nanzhao (南召) as the new mayor of the town and the commander the local garrison. The former nationalist garrison of the Square City (Fang Cheng, 方城), meanwhile, was ordered back to the town under Wang Jingxiu (王敬修), the commander. On November 11, 1947, the communist 10th Brigade of the 4th Column in the eastern foothills of the Funiu Mountains launched a surprise attack on Square City (Fang Cheng, 方城), and the nationalist defenders abandoned the town and fled, and the town fell into the enemy hands for the second time. On November 13, 1947, the fleeing nationalists were caught up by the 31st Regiment of the 11th Brigade of the communist 4th Column at Erlang Temple, and were thus badly mauled by the pursuing enemy. The nationalist commander Wang Jingxiu (王敬修) learned that the nationalist 20th Division was moving toward Square City (Fang Cheng, 方城), so he ordered his surviving troops to move toward the town in an attempt to link up with his nationalist comrades-in-arms. Little did the nationalists know that their enemy was waiting to ambush them.

On November 21, 1947, the communist 10th Brigade of the 4th Column suddenly struck the town of Nanzhao (南召), and the nationalist garrison consisted on a security regiment and two companies was overwhelmed. After losing three companies, including more than 50 killed and over 270 captured alive by the attacking enemy, the surviving nationalists were forced to abandon the town and flee, and thus town of Nanzhao (南召) had fallen into the enemy hands for the second time, and this time for good. On November 22, 1947, as the nationalist commander Wang Jingxiu (王敬修)'s surviving Self Defense of the Square City (Fang Cheng, 方城) reached Eight Mile Intersection (Ba Li Cha, 八里岔), King Yu's Village (Wang Yu Zhuang, 王禹庄), and Eastern Qi Village (Dong Qi Zhuang, 东齐庄) regions south of Square City (Fang Cheng, 方城), it was ambushed by the communist 31st Regiment of the 11th Brigade of the 4th Column. Only 100 or so under the command of the commander of the nationalist force Bai Guixuan (白桂煊) was lucky enough to escape, while all of the rest were annihilated by the waiting enemy. The nationalists suffered 740 fatalities and another 400+ were captured alive by the enemy, including the deputy commander Ma Lianfu (马廉府), who was able to successfully escape later during a forced march. After his escape, Ma Lianfu (马廉府) immediately went to Kaifeng to ask the nationalist provincial chairman Liu Maoen (刘茂恩) for help, but instead, he was executed on the spot for his failure as Liu Maoen (刘茂恩) ordered him to be shot in front of other nationalist commanders. On the other front, the communist 38th Army established a new base in the regions of Merchant County (Shang Xian, 商县), Luonan (洛南) and Merchant Southern (Shang Nan, 商南), while the communist 12th Brigade established another new base in the regions of Mountain Sun (Shan Yang, 山阳), Yun Xi (郧西), Zhen'an (Zhen An, 镇安), Upper Pass (Shang Guan, 上关).

On November 23, 1947, the nationalist 133rd Brigade of the 20th Division under the Divisional commander Yang Gancai (杨干才) begun its push toward Square City (Fang Cheng, 方城) from Independent tree (Du Shu, 独树) Town, but the progress was slow due to the stubborn resistance from the 10th Brigade and the 11th Brigade of the communist 4th Column at Yueyang Village (Yue Yang Zhuang, 岳杨庄), Zan Village (Zan Zhuang, 昝庄), and Northern New Street (Bei Xin Jie, 北新街) regions. On November 24, 1947, the nationalist 134th Brigade of the 20th Division also begun its push toward Square City (Fang Cheng, 方城) from Nanyang, Henan, and after some setback at Pengyao (盆窑) regions due to enemy resistance, managed to link up with the nationalist133rd Brigade of the 20th Division in the region to east of Square City (Fang Cheng, 方城). The enemy gave up the town without a fight in attempt to lure the nationalists into the mountain for an ambush but the nationalists refused to be baited and would not venture out of the protection of the city wall. Realizing the isolated was in danger being besieged by the enemy and thus suffering possible annihilation, the nationalists wisely decided to abandon Square City (Fang Cheng, 方城) on November 25, 1947, and retreated toward Wuyang (舞阳), and the campaign concluded with Square City (Fang Cheng, 方城) fell into the enemy hands for a third time, and this time for good.

== Outcome ==
The nationalists suffered more than 12,000 fatalities in their defeat, and a total of eighteen cities and towns had fallen into the enemy hands. In addition, the enemy had successfully turned the guerilla base in the Funiu Mountains into a new communist base, furthermore, the enemy was successful in establishing several brand new communist bases and thus further threatened the nationalist reign in the North China Plain. The communist success was mainly due to the correct strategy of first luring the technically superior nationalist opponent into dispersing its forces into many smaller fragments, and then to concentrate overwhelmingly numerically superior force in one battle on a single fragmented nationalist force for annihilation, and eventually, accumulate many small victories into large ones. The result of the communist strategy was that a total of eighteen towns and cities fell into the communist hands, and the communists had established themselves firmly in the border areas of Henan, Hubei and Shaanxi provinces.

== See also ==
- Outline of the Chinese Civil War
- National Revolutionary Army
- History of the People's Liberation Army
