= Funiu Mountains =

Mountain range in China

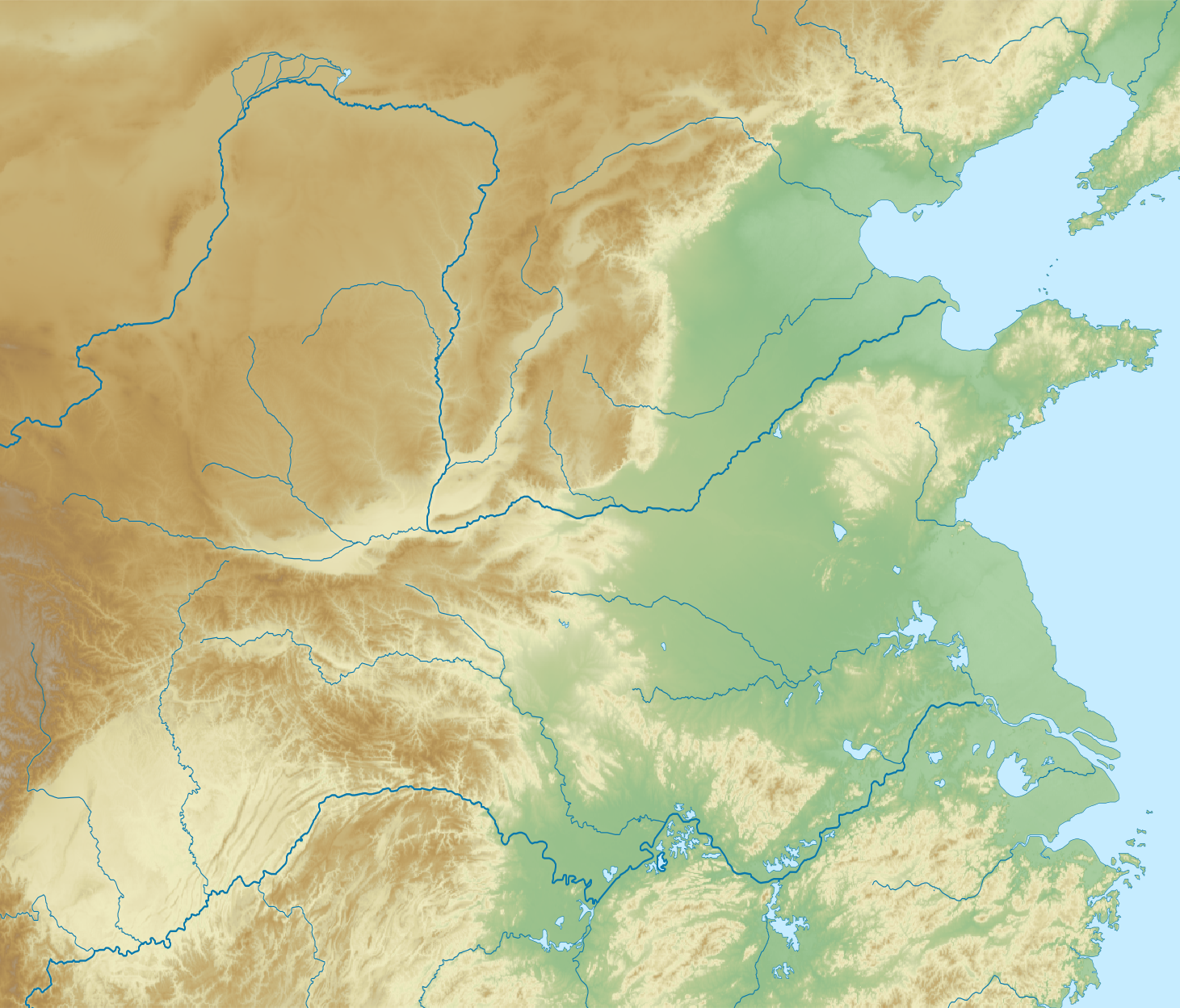
- Location within Northern China Location within China

Highest point
- Elevation: 1,225 m (4,019 ft)
- Coordinates: 33°39.756′N 111°47.202′E

Naming
- Native name: 伏牛山 (Chinese)

Geography
- Country: People's Republic of China
- Region: Henan

Funiu Mountains
- Chinese: 伏牛山
- Literal meaning: Falling Cow Mountain(s)
Transcriptions
Standard Mandarin
- Hanyu Pinyin: Fúniúshān
- Wade–Giles: Fu-niu Shan

The Funiu Mountains, also known by their Chinese name Funiu Shan, (Note: The name was also previously romanized as Foo-new Shan.) are a mountain range in southern Shanxi and western Henan provinces in China.

== Geography ==
The Funiu are an eastern extension of the Qins, running south of the Yellow River after its southern return from the Ordos Loop. The hills to its east bear the headwaters to tributaries to the Huai.

== History ==
During the Chinese Civil War, the eastern foothills of the Funius were the site of a 1947 Communist victory over the Nationalist army.

== Sites ==
- Funiu Shan World Geology Park

== Culture ==
The geographer Zheng Ruoceng considered the kung fu of the Buddhist monks of the Funius second in China after that practiced by the monks of Shaolin. They specialized in staves.

The mountains are also the namesake of the Funiu White, a Chinese goat breed.
