= Campaign of the North China Plain Pocket =

1946 battle of the Second Chinese Civil War

- Part of Chinese Civil War
Date	June 22, 1946 – August 31, 1946
Location	Southern North China Plain, China
Result	Communist victory

Belligerents
National Revolutionary Army	Chinese Red Army

Commanders and leaders
Liu Shi; Cheng Qian	Li Xiannian; Wang Zhen

Strength
300,000	60,000

Casualties and losses
10,000	10,000

The Campaign of the North China Plain Pocket, also called the Breakout on the Central Plains (Chinese: 中原突围; pinyin: Zhongyuan Tuwei) by the Chinese Communist Party, was a series of battles fought between the nationalists and the communists during the Chinese Civil War, resulting in a successful communist breakout from the nationalist encirclement. The campaign marked the beginning of the full-scale civil war fought between the communists and the nationalists in the post-World War II era.

The communist victory was largely attributed to their ability to surprise the nationalists with movements and avoid battle in locations with overwhelming Nationalist forces. In a sense, the Nationalists did not evenly distribute their forces, which created pocket holes in their encirclement. The Nationalists were also easily distracted by small Communist forces used to draw attention away from their main forces. The communist was able to locate the relatively weaker defended points of the Nationalist defense and break them. Communists also engaged in close-quarters combat in order to limit the power of the Nationalist artillery and air force, making them less effective than they could have been.

== Prelude ==
The communist base in this region was established in the middle of World War II along the border area of the Hubei, Hunan, Henan, Jiangxi, and Anhui provinces after the communists had successfully driven Japanese forces from the countryside and remote mountainous regions. After the end of World War II, the returning nationalists were determined to eliminate the communists in the region. After more than 240 offensives with a mobilized force of 300,000, they had successfully blockaded the communist base and divided it into three isolated pieces. The nationalist headquarters at Zhengzhou was tasked with the job to eliminate the enemy in the region with the help of the nationalist Wuhan headquarters.

In mid-June 1946, Chiang Kai-shek issued a secret order to the Liu Zhi (刘峙), the nationalist Commander-in-chief of Zhengzhou headquarters and Cheng Qian (程潜), and the nationalist Commander-in-chief of Wuhan Headquarters, giving the general direction of the operation by mobilizing the nationalist blockade force to launch a decisive assault on the besieged communists. Since both sides were still officially at peace, the nationalist forces under the command of Wuhan headquarters would be transferred to the command of the Zhengzhou headquarters in order to avoid the blame of the general public. At 2:00 p.m. on June 20, 1946, Liu Zhi (刘峙) issued the order to every unit of the nationalist force under his command, and the general objective was to mass troops with absolute numerical and technical superiority to concentrate on the communists in the border areas of Henan and Hubei provinces, eliminating the enemy forces after separating them into smaller pockets by attacking them from southern and eastern Henan. The communist force at/near Xinyang, Jingfu (经扶), Huangchuan (潢川) regions, especially those at Xuanhua Hotel (Xuanhua Dian, 宣化店) and Pobo (泼陂) River regions would be the most desirable target.

== Order of battle ==
The nationalists mobilized roughly 300,000 troops for the planned elimination of the communists and the subsequent occupation of their base. The communists planned to leave over half of their 60,000 strong force in the region to fight the guerrilla war after the other half had withdrawn.

=== Encirclement force: nationalist order of battle ===
- Commander-in-chief of Zhengzhou Headquarters: Liu Zhi 刘峙
- Commander-in-chief of Wuhan Headquarters: Cheng Qian 程潜
  - The 11th Army
  - The 48th Army
  - The 1st Division
  - The 3rd Division
  - The 11th Division
  - The 15th Division
  - The 41st Division
  - The 47th Division
  - The 48th Division
  - The 66th Division
  - The 72nd Division
  - The 75th Division
  - The 90th Division
  - The 169th Brigade
  - Local Security Brigades and Regiments

=== Breakout force: communist order of battle ===
The communists called their base the Central Plains Military Region with a total force of 60,000, including two columns and three military districts totaling six division-strength brigades:

Central Plains Military Region prior to the breakout:

- Commander-in-chief: Li Xiannian
- Deputy commander-in-chief: Wang Zhen and Wan Shusheng (王树声)
- Political commissar: Zheng Weisan (郑位三)
- Deputy political commissar: (王首道)
- Chief-of-staff: Wang Zhen
- Deputy Chief-of-staff: Zhu Zaoguan (朱早观)
- Chief of the Political Directorate: Wan Shoudao (王首道)
- Deputy Chief of the Political Directorate: Liu Xing (刘型)
- First Column:
  - Commander-in-chief: Wang Shusheng (王树声)
  - Political commissar: Dai Jiying (戴季英)
- Second Column:
  - Commander-in-chief: Wen Jianwu(文建武)
  - Political Commissar: (任质斌)
- Jianghan (江汉) Military District:
  - Commander-in-chief: Luo Houfu (罗厚福)
  - Political Commissar: Wen Minsheng (文敏生)
- Eastern Hubei Military District:
  - Commander-in-chief: Zhang Tixue (张体学)
  - Political Commissar: Nie Hongjun (聂鸿钧)
- Henan Military District:
  - Commander-in-chief and Political Commissar: Huang Lin (黄 霖)

While the negotiation with the nationalists for the legal withdraw continued, preparation was also made for the inevitable, and the communist force was restructured into three groups for the breakout:

- Right Route Force: 15,000 troops under the command of Li Xiannian, consisted of:
  - The headquarters staff of the original communist base
  - The 13th Brigade of the 2nd Column
  - The 45th Regiment of the 15th Brigade of the 2nd Column
  - The 359th Brigade under the command of Wang Zhen
  - The Cadres Brigade
- Left Route Force: 10,000 troops under the command of Wang Shusheng (王树声) and Liu Zijiu (刘子久), consisted of:
  - Most units of the 1st Column, with the exception of the 1st Brigade.
  - The 15th Brigade of the 2nd Column (except the 45th Regiment).
- Eastern Route Force: 7,000 troops commanded by the commander Pi Dingjun (皮定钧) and political commissar Xu Zirong (徐子荣).
  - The 1st Brigade of the 1st Column
- The remaining of units were tasked to cover the main force to break out and then remain in the region afterward to fight guerrilla wars against the enemy, and the majority of the forces of the Jianghan (江汉) Military District would withdraw to the west of the Xiang River (襄河).

== Strategies ==
=== The nationalist strategy ===
The nationalist commander-in-chief of the operation Liu Zhi 刘峙 made the following plans: The nationalist 41st Division guarding Xuchang, Queshan and Minggang was deployed to Xinyang and Luo Mountain (Luo Shan, 罗山) to take regions included Hill Mountain Gate (Gang Shan Meng, 岗山门), Dragon Town (Long Zhen, 龙镇), Light Mountain (Guang Shan, 光山), and Chen Xing's Hotel (Chen Xing Dian, 陈兴店), and attack northward to Xuanhua Hotel (Xuanhua Dian, 宣化店) region. The nationalist 47th Division guarding the Light Mountain (Guang Shan, 光山) and the Luo Mountain (Luo Shan, 罗山) regions was deployed to the east and west of Light Mountain (Guang Shan, 光山) region in order to occupy regions included Sleeping Dragon Stage (Wo Long Tai, 卧龙台), Fuliu Hotel (Fu Liu Dian, 付流店), and then would attack northeastward toward Pobo (泼陂) River and adjacent regions. The 174th Brigade of the nationalist 48th Division under the command of Wei Lihuang was redeployed to the north and the south of Merchant City (Shang Cheng, 商城) to occupy regions included Fuliu Hotel (Fu Liu Dian, 付流店), Dachong (大冲), Shuangmenlan (双门拦), and then would also attack in the Pobo (泼陂) River direction.

The nationalist 72nd Division guarding Huang'an (黄安) and Jingfu (经扶) was redeployed to occupy regions included Wester River (Xi He, 西河), Jingfu (经扶) and Shuangmenlan (双门拦), and most of its units with the exception of the 15th Brigade would attack in the Pobo (泼陂) River direction. The 15th Brigade of the nationalist 72nd Division would attack in the direction of King Yu's City (禹王城) to coordinate its attack with that of the 18th Brigade of the nationalist 11th on Mulan Magnolia Mountains from Huangpi (黄陂). The nationalist 66th Division guarding Xinyang and Garden (Huayua, 花园) regions was deployed to regions included Summer Hotel (Xia Dian, 夏 店), Guo Family's Hotel (Guo Jia Dian, 郭家店), Great New Hotel (Da Xin Dian, 大新店) to attack Xuanhua Hotel (Xuanhua Dian, 宣化店) region. The nationalist 15th guarding Square City (Fang Cheng, 方城) and Noon Sun (Wu Yang, 午阳) regions was deployed to Xinyang and Guangshui to occupy Great New Hotel (Da Xin Dian, 大新店) and Three Miles Hotel (San Li Dian, 三里店) regions, and then would attack Xuanhua Hotel (Xuanhua Dian, 宣化店) region.

A portion of the nationalist 169th Brigade, the 3rd Division and the 75th Division were taken for support. Liu Zhi 刘峙, the nationalist commander-in-chief of the operation was confident that the first full scale confrontation between Chiang Kai-shek and his communist enemy of the Chinese Civil War in the post-World War II era would result in a decisive nationalist victory. The deployment of the nationalist force was concentrated in the eastern direction, which appeared to be the most obvious direction that the enemy would be likely to take.

=== Communist strategy ===
The communists were initially divided on the withdrawal strategy. On June 2, 1946, the political commissar, Zheng Weisan (郑位三), of the communist force telegraphed Mao Zedong to report the initial strategy, suggesting that the bulk of the force should attempt to enter Wudang Mountains in western Hubei, and when the situation allowed, enter Sichuan. The remaining force would split into two parts with one part remaining in the region to fight a guerrilla war. The other part would strike southwestward, first reaching Hunan because it was easier to cross the Yangtze River in comparison to the Yellow River. On June 14, 1946, Zheng Weisan telegraphed Mao Zedong for a second time for an update, claiming that there were two opinions, and the first one insisted on staying in the region to fight a guerrilla war south of the Yellow River in Hubei, Henan, Sichuan and Shaanxi provinces, and even to expand south of the Yangtze River when the situation allowed. The second opinion preferred to withdraw to North China Plain because it was simply too difficult to stay in the original region. On July 19, 1946, Yan'an replied by claiming that there were two possibilities: one was that the northern withdraw was successful, and the other that the withdraw was impossible, so that preparation must be made to achieve the first objective whenever possible, and to be safe, plans must be also made to create new communist base if the northward withdraw was not possible.

In accordance with the instructions from Yan'an, the local communists made the decision to break out westward with the bulk of the existing force. There were two parts of the plan: the first was to push toward regions via Inner Township County (Nei Xiang, 内乡), Xichuan (淅川) and Jingzi Pass (Jingzi Guang, 荆紫关) via the Funiu guerrilla base, and after the nationalist force guarding Xuchang was forced to redeploy, the communist force would then cross the railroad and rivers to reach the communist base in Taiyue (太岳) region via Lushi (卢氏) and Luoning (洛宁). If unsuccessful, then the communists would fight a guerrilla war from their guerrilla base in the Funiu Mountains and then expand to the Qins, gradually reaching southern Gansu or Shaanxi to link up with the communists in these bases. If unable to achieve this first objective, the communists were also prepared to enter Wudang Mountains by crossing the Xiang (襄) River to create new communist base, and when the situation permitted, enter southern Gansu via Sichuan, but the first objective should be achieved whenever it was possible. The second part of the plan involved leaving at least 10,000 troops behind in central and eastern Hubei to fight a guerrilla war and if the guerrilla warfare was not sustainable, then the communist force remained in central Hubei would break out into the Wudang Mountains, and eastern Hubei would break out to southern Anhui.

To carry out the plan, the communist force was divided into three forces along different routes. The communist Right Route Force would attempt to break out in northwestern direction to reach the communist base in the border area of Hubei, Henan and Shaanxi provinces after crossing the Beijing–Hankou railroad between Xinyang and Guangshui. The communist Left Route Force would attempt to break out in a southwestern direction by crossing the same railroad between Garden (Huayua, 花园) and Xinyang, reaching the town of Qiyi (祁仪) south of Tanghe (唐河) county. The Eastern Route force was tasked to fake as the main force and attract the enemy for three days in order to guarantee the rest of the force had crossed the Beijing–Hankou railroad. Afterward, the Eastern Route Force was to go eastward, reaching the communist base in the border area of Jiangsu and Anhui provinces.

== The initial stage ==
On June 26, 1946, the full scale Chinese Civil War had formally begun when the nationalists begun their attack on Xuanhua Hotel (Xuanhua Dian, 宣化店) region, the center of the communist base in the North China Plain in four fronts. The nationalist 122nd Brigade of the 41st Division attacked from Xinyang, and the nationalist 47th Division attacked from Light Mountain (Guang Shan, 光山) and Luo Mountain (Luo Shan, 罗山). The nationalist 174th Brigade of the 48th Division attacked from Merchant City (Shang Cheng, 商城), and respectively from Huang'an (黄安) and Jingfu (经扶), the Newly Organized 13th Brigade and the Newly Organized 15th Brigade of the nationalist 72nd Division attacked. The nationalist 15th Division and 66th Division were deployed along the Beijing – Hankou railroad to strengthen the blockade. In the meantime, the communists also begun their planned breakout.

== The Right Route ==
On June 26, 1946, the communist Right Route force departed from Xuanhua Hotel (Xuanhua Dian, 宣化店) region to secretly group in the regions of Se Harbor (Se Gang, 涩港) and Nine Miles Pass (Jiu Li Guang九里关), south of Xinyang. On the night of June 29, 1946, the communist launched a surprise attack on the nationalist 135th Brigade of the 15th Division at He Family's Hotel (He Jian Dian, 贺 家店) and after losing two companies, the nationalists withdrew. The communists subsequently took Willow Grove (Liu Lin, 柳林) train station and crossed Beijing – Hankou railroad. By July 1, 1946, the communist Right Route Force had reached regions of Spring Hotel (Quankou Dian, 泉口店), Wu Family's Hotel (Wu Jia Dian, 吴家 店), and Jiang Creek Hotel (Jiang Creek Hotel, 浆溪店) north of Ying Mountain (Ying Shan, 应山) regions.

On July 3, 1946, the nationalist order the 3rd Brigade of the 3rd Division and the 41st Division to the regions of Li Mountain (Li Shan, 厉山), High City (Gao Cheng, 高城), Sky River Mouth (Tian He Kou, 天河口) north of Sui (随) County. However, before the last element of the nationalist trap at Sky River Mouth (Tian He Kou, 天河口) was completed, the enemy had already managed to escape to Deer Head (鹿头) Town northeast of Zaoyang. Undeterred, the nationalist attempted to set up a second encirclement by ordering the 3rd Division stationed at Zaoyang, the 41st Division, and the 15th Division to Cangtai (苍苔) region along with air support, hoping to eliminate the communist forces in a second trap. However, after a forced march of 90 km in a single day, these forces had already passed the town of Cangtai (苍苔), Tang River (Tang He, 唐河) and White River (Bai He, 白河) counties. Thereby escaping the second trap planned by the nationalists, they reached the region of Teacher's Hill (Shi Gang, 师岗) south of Inner Township County (Nei Xiang, 内乡) in southwestern Henan on July 11, 1946.

To distract the nationalists, the communists decided to split into two columns. The left column consisted of the 45th Regiment of the 15th Brigade and the 13th Brigade of the communist 2nd Column totaling 7,000 people, and would march toward the region of Nanhua Pound (Nan Hua Tang, 南化塘) via the town of Xichuan (淅川). The right column under the command of Wang Zhen consisted of 359th Brigade and the Cadres Brigade would take the town of Xichuan (淅川) and Jingzi Pass (Jingzi Guang, 荆紫关) in advance for the main force, and then continue to its destinations at Mountain Sun (Shan Yang, 山阳) and Zuoshui (柞水) regions in southern Shaanxi after the left column had passed Nanhua Pound (Nan Hua Tang, 南化塘) region.

In the meantime, the nationalists made new plans for setting up a third trap for the communists by deploying the 3rd Division, 15th Division, 41st Division, and the 47th Division in regions south of Nanyang, Henan, Zhenping (镇平), Inner Township County (Nei Xiang, 内乡), regions along the Dan River (Dan Jiang, 丹江), and regions to the north and to the east of Xichuan (淅川) and Deng (邓) County. The 61st Brigade of the nationalist 90th stationed at Shan (陕) County and the 1st Brigade of the nationalist 1st stationed at Guanzhong were deployed to Jingzi Pass (Jingzi Guang, 荆紫关), the chokepoint of the traffic linking Hubei, Henan, and Shaanxi provinces to complete the trap, and the nationalist plan was to eliminate the enemy on the eastern bank of the Dan River (Dan Jiang, 丹江). The communists in turn, were determined to avoid this fate by crossing the Dan River (Dan Jiang, 丹江) and continue westward, eventually entering Shaanxi.

=== The Right Column ===
The nationalist force consisted of the 124th Brigade of the 41st Division, the 125th Brigade of the 47th Division, and the Western Nanyang Security Regiment. It had managed to control all of the crossing points along the Dan River, including Xichuan (淅川), Stirrup Shop (Madeng Pu, 马蹬辅) and Official Li's Bridge (Li Guan Qiao, 李官桥). On July 13, 1946, the communist 359th Brigade launched its offensive to take these crossing points in heavy rains by besieging Xichuan (淅川) as the communist 13th Brigade besieged Stirrup Shop (Madeng Pu, 马蹬辅), while the rest of the communist force fought off the nationalists in pursuit. The local nationalist defenders fell to the tenacious and determined communist attackers, and after a few brief battles the nationalist forces were annihilated. On July 14, 1946, the entire communist Left Route Force successfully crossed the Dan River (Dan Jiang, 丹江) despite constant nationalist aerial attacks. This maneuver dashed the nationalist hope of eliminating the enemy on the eastern bank of the Dan River (Dan Jiang, 丹江) in the third trap.

On July 15, 1946, when the communist 359th Brigade had reached Jingzi Pass (Jingzi Guang, 荆紫关), the nationalists in pursuit caught up with the communists. It was obvious that the communists were unable to take the Jingzi Pass (Jingzi Guang, 荆紫关) which was guarded by an overwhelming nationalist force and the communist 359th Brigade was in danger of being wiped out. Wang Zhen, the communist commander decided to turn south and cross the Dan River (Dan Jiang, 丹江) again, and then marched southwestward into the mountains. Wang Zhen's action was completely unexpected by the nationalists, and so forced the nationalists to redeploy their troops in an attempt to trap Wang Zhen's forces. With this move, valuable time was lost and this provided the communists the break they needed.

As the nationalists scrambled their forces to follow Wang Zhen's communist force southwestward, Wang Zhen unexpectedly turned again toward Abalone Ridge (Baoyu Ling, 鲍鱼岭), south of Jingzi Pass (Jingzi Guang, 荆紫关). They defeated the nationalist 1st Brigade of the 1st Division that attempted to stop them in the region between Abalone Ridge (Baoyu Ling, 鲍鱼岭) and Nanhua Pound (Nan Hua Tang, 南化塘), and successfully entered the Jade Emperor Mountain (Yuhuang Shan, 玉皇山). The communist intention was clear by then: entering southern Shaanxi as they had originally planned, but via a different route unexpected by their nationalist adversary. As the nationalist gathered all available forces to attack the communist right column, it was obvious that the nationalists had run out time and troops, because due to the completely unexpected communist moves, the nationalists simply could not gather enough strength to stop the enemy. After a fierce battle that lasted two days and a night, the communist right column successfully defeated the nationalists attempted to stop them and eventually managed to reach their planned destinations, the Mountain Sun (Shan Yang, 山阳) and Zuoshui (柞水) regions in southern Shaanxi. Although the nationalist force was in hot pursuit, it was only a matter of time before the communist right column reached safety. It did so by the end of August 1946 by reaching the communist base in Shaanxi, with no major nationalist forces in their way any longer. Wang Zhen's 359th Brigade suffered the heaviest communist casualties in the campaign: 2,917 were lost, and only 1,983 remained when the surviving forces reached Shaanxi, where their number were boosted when 3,000 troops had to be sent to the brigade to make up the loss.

=== The Left Column ===
On July 17, 1946, the communist left column reached the Nanhua Pound (Nan Hua Tang, 南化塘) region after the right column. By this time, the nationalist 1st Brigade of the 1st Division previously defeated by the communist right column had regrouped and blocked the path of the communist right column. Although the communist right column managed to attract the enemy to itself and away from the communist left column, this also meant that the communist Right Route had been cut into two sections. With two nationalist divisions in pursuit, the nationalists had hoped to wipe out the communist left column in the valley of Nanhua Pound (Nan Hua Tang, 南化塘).

The situation was apparent to both sides and Li Xiannian made plans to open the path to Shaanxi for the communists by defeating the nationalist 1st Division first. The 37th Regiment of the communist 13th Brigade was to attack the enemy while the 39th Regiment was to outflank the enemy from the left, while the 38th Regiment was to provide cover at the right flank of the 37th Regiment. After a fierce battle that lasted the entire night, the nationalist 1st Division was once again beaten by the enemy before the other two nationalist divisions could catch up and participate in the fight, and the communists successfully continued their westward march afterward.

On July 20, 1946, when the communist left column reached the region of Zhao Family's River (Zhao Jia Chuan, 赵家川), the nationalist 3rd Division was the only thing stop them from reaching their goal. With other nationalist units far away from the region, the nationalists were well aware that the communist forces were unstoppable, despite holding advantaged positions in a favorable terrain. After sixteen hours of fierce battle with no reinforcement and victory in sight, the nationalist 3rd Division made a hasty retreat despite only suffering over a thousand casualties, leaving over 400 fallen comrades behind. With its path cleared, the communist left column reached its destination of Shangnan (商南) county in southern Shaanxi on July 29, 1946, successfully evaded the nationalist encirclement, and by August 3, 1946, the communist left column of the Right Route force had successfully established a new communist guerrilla base in the border region of Shaanxi, Hubei and Henan provinces.

== Left Route ==
On June 25, 1946, the communist Left Route force left the Pobo (泼陂) River and White Sparrow Garden (Baique Yuan, 白雀园) regions of Light Mountain (Guangshan, 光山) counties to march in southwestern direction. However, once reached Yangping Pass (Yangping Kou, 阳平口) to the west of the Gift Mountain (Li Shan, 礼山), their path was blocked by the nationalist 554th Regiment of the 185th Brigade of the 66th Division, the communists thus turned westward instead, begun their crossing of the Beijing – Hankou railroad at the section between Wang's Family's Hotel (Wang Jia Dian, 王家店) and Wei's Family's Hotel (Wei Jia Dian, 魏家店). While fighting off the 6th Brigade of the nationalist 75th Division and the bulk of the 185th Brigade of the nationalist 66th Division that attempted to stop them, the nationalist 11th Division at Xiaogan sent out its 18th Brigade to reinforce their nationalist comrades-in-arms with armor and air supports on June 30, 1946. However, the technical superiority was successfully negated by the enemy by fighting in close quarters at night, and before the dawn of July 1, 1946, the entire enemy force had successfully crossed the Beijing – Hankou railroad, reaching Anlu (安陆) and Ying Mountain (Ying Shan, 应山) regions.

The communists of the Left Route had not escaped danger yet, and they still had to cross the Xiang (襄) River southeast of Xuan City (Xuan Cheng, 宣城). Once the communist Left Route force reached the crossing points at Yakou (垭口) and Flowing Water Ditch (Liu Shui Gou, 流水沟) on July 11, 1946, they discovered that local communist force of the Jianghan (江汉) Military District had already crossed the river and the nationalists had destroyed most of the ships. The communists managed to found seven ships and begun the crossing immediately, and the 7th Regiment and the 9th Regiment of the communist 3rd Brigade successfully crossed the river at Yakou (垭口) crossing point. The 4th Regiment of the communist 2nd Brigade at Flowing Water Ditch (Liu Shui Gou, 流水沟) crossing point was in the process of crossing when the nationalist 16th Brigade of the 75th Division reached the crossing point, but under the cover of the 8th Regiment of the communist 3rd Brigade on the eastern bank, the 4th Regiment of the communist 2nd Brigade was able to complete the crossing. The remaining communists on the eastern bank, however, were cut off by the dawn of July 11, 1946.

However, such setback turned out to be a blessing for the communists who were cut off on the eastern bank of Xiang (襄) River, because the nationalists were putting emphasis on the communist main force that had already crossed, and thus did not deploy enough troops to stop those communists remained on the eastern bank of the Xiang (襄) River. The communist units that were cut off on the eastern bank of Xiang (襄) River included the 8th Regiment of the communist 3rd Brigade and the 6th Regiment of the communist 2nd Brigade, and portions of the Garrison Regiment and the 15th Brigade totaling 3,500. Under the command of the deputy brigade commander of the communist 3rd Brigade, Min Xuesheng (闵学胜), this group of communists turned north, passing Zaoyang, Xinye, and Tanghe (唐河) county to reach the alternative destination, the communist guerrilla bases in the Funiu Mountains, thus achieving successful breakout before the main force.

The main communist force of the Left Route Force consisted of units that had successfully crossed the Xiang (襄) River and was not too far behind either in that they only face one more obstacle, the last nationalist defense line manned by the 185th Brigade of the nationalist 66th Division and the 64th Brigade of the nationalist 15th Division. With the earlier failures of stopping the enemy by the nationalist units with much superior strength and the reinforcement nowhere in sight, nationalists manning the last defensive line were well aware that the enemy was unstoppable. After suffering a thousand or so casualties, the nationalists had had enough and the nationalist commanders decided to save the surviving troops instead of wasting lives on the futile attempts to stop the enemy. On July 21, 1946, the nationalists abandoned their last defensive line in a hasty retreat that left over 300 cadavers of their fallen comrades-in-arms, and thus allowing the communist Left Route force to successfully escape the encirclement. After another failed nationalist attempt to eliminate the enemy which resulted in the successful link-up between the communist Left Route force and the communist units of Jianghan (江汉) Military District in Wudang Mountains, the communist Left Route force successfully established a new base: the Northwestern Hubei Guerrilla Base by August 27, 1946.

== Eastern route ==
In accordance with the original plan, the communist 1st Brigade of the 1st Column faked itself as the communist main force at White Sparrow Garden (Baique Yuan, 白雀园) region southeast of Light Mountain (Guang Shan, 光山) County. At the dawn of June 26, 1946, the 174th Brigade and an independent regiment of the nationalist 48th Division attacked the region with help of the nationalist 47th Division from both the north and the south sides. After fierce fighting, the communist 1st Brigade of the 1st Column penetrated deep behind the nationalist line from Liujiachong (刘家冲) on June 28, 1946, thus creating the false impression that the main communist force was attempting to break out in the south. Immediately afterward, the communist 1st Brigade of the 1st Column turned eastward, reaching Little Border Ridge (Xiao Jie Ling, 小界岭), the chokepoint of the link between the Hubei and Henan provinces, after successfully breaching the first nationalist blockade line and beaten back the Newly Organized 13th Brigade of the nationalist 72nd Division, hence completed its mission of attracting the enemy to itself and thus providing the opportunity for the communist main force to cross the railroad.

By July 1, 1946, the communist 1st Brigade of the 1st Column had reached another chokepoint of the link in between the Hubei and Henan provinces in Merchant City (Shang Cheng, 商城) county, the 1,900-metre-high mountain pass named Pine Seed Pass (Song Zi Guan, 松子关), which was guarded by local nationalist security regiments from the Merchant City (Shang Cheng, 商城) and the Gold Camp (Jin Zhai, 金寨) counties. However, the local defenders proved to be no match for the attacking enemy, and after the mountain peak to the right of the mountain pass fell into the enemy hands, the defense collapsed and the enemy was able to pass under heavy rain and without any replenishment. By July 3, 1946, the communist 1st Brigade of the 1st Column reached the region of Wu's Family's Hotel (Wu Jian Dian, 吴 家店) in the center of Dabie Mountains, but when the communists reached the Green Wind Ridge (Qingfeng Ling, 青风岭), the nationalist 48th Division had already occupied the peak, thus blocking the way, and in the meantime, the nationalists were also closing in from behind. The communists deployed their 1st Regiment to attract the attention of the nationalist 48th Division while the 2nd Regiment outflanked the defenders from the right and attacked from the rear, successfully taking the peak and dispersed the defenders. With the favorable landscape, it was the nationalists turn to be blockaded and there was nothing the pursuing nationalist force could do to stop the enemy.

The victory of the Green Wind Ridge enabled the communists to control the high ground directly opposite to the Mozi Deep Pool (Mozi Tan, 磨子潭) region on the western bank of Pi (淠) River, and under the heavy fire from the enemy on the higher ground on the eastern bank, the defenders of the crossing point on the western bank had no choice but to withdraw, thus enabling the enemy to safely across Pi River, and thus successfully escaped the nationalist encirclement. The communist 1st Brigade of the 1st Column subsequently crushed the 138th Division of the nationalist 48th Army in its futile attempt to stop the communists in the region between Lu'an (六安) and Hefei, and successfully reached the communist base in the border area of Jiangsu and Anhui provinces with the remaining 5,000 troops before the rest units of the nationalist 48th Army could have a chance to catch up with the enemy. After twenty-three battles in twenty-four days and traveling more than 500 km, the communist Eastern Route Force became the first among the three to successfully break out.

== Outcome ==
Although the communist success appeared to be nothing short of a miracle, in reality, nothing could be further from the truth because the nationalist attempt to eliminate the communist in the North China Plain was doomed to fail from the very beginning due to various blunders Chiang Kai-shek had made, and one of the first was that the failure to realize the political fallout of the militarily sensible action. The nationalists had made a military sensible decision in attacking the enemy in the region when it was the weakest, and successfully broken up the enemy base into three isolated parts. However, the timing was extremely poor because the 240+ assaults on the enemy base came shortly after the truce agreement was reached between the nationalists and the communists, and the full-scale civil war had not broken out yet. In contrast, the enemy with absolutely technical and numerical disadvantage, dared not to provoke the nationalists, and instead, wisely chose to give up the communist base and requested to legally withdraw under the nationalist government's permission. The nationalist regime of course rejected the communist request, since it was on the verge of wiping out the enemy in the region, or at least so they thought, but in doing so, the nationalists had further alienated themselves from the general populace, which was already sympathetic toward the communists in the region due to the nationalist breach of the truce when they attacked the numerically and technically inferior local communists who wisely chose to avoid any provocation of its own. The sentiment was still widely held by the general civilian population, especially in the local regions when the full scale Chinese Civil War had broken out, and the military sensible alternative had put the nationalists in a dilemma because of the political fallout due to the nationalists military actions before the breakout of the full-scale civil war.

If the bad timing of the nationalist assaults on the much weaker enemy had alienated the civilian populace, especially in the regions where this campaign was fought, the location the nationalists chose certainly turned the alienations into resentment against the nationalist regime. This communist base in the North China Plain bordering the Henan-Anhui-Hubei-Hunan-Jiangxi provinces was established in the latter stages of World War II, after the communists had successfully driven the Japanese from the countryside. The local population had already blamed nationalists for losing the regions to the Japanese invaders, and supported the only Chinese force left in the region, the communists who had successfully establishing bases mostly in the rural regions where better life was provided to the general populace in comparison to that of Japanese occupied regions, and instead of attacking the enemy in regions where at least there were some forms of the nationalists presence during World War II so that there were some legitimacy and popular support, the nationalist assaults on this regions with absolutely no nationalist presence during the war not only caused them the popular support, but also turned the local popular opinion against the nationalists.

Chiang Kai-shek and his supporters were well aware of these two political fallouts but nonetheless took the risk by launching their offensives as planned. The nationalist sympathizers argued that despite the dilemma, Chiang had to proceed due to the immediate military feasibilities, because if the actions were delayed any longer, the situation might turn for the worse (and this was quite possible in reality) for the nationalists and thus making it much for difficult to eradicate the enemy had the nationalists waited, a chance Chiang simply could not afford to take at the time, and this valid argument was even agreed by the enemy they were fighting. Unfortunately for Chiang Kai-shek (and thus fortunately for his communist enemy), the nationalist gamble did not pay off.

The biggest blunder committed by the nationalists, however, was the deployment of troops due to Chiang Kai-shek's attempt to simultaneously solve the warlord problem that had plagued China for so long and the problem of the extermination of communism together, which proved to be a fatal mistake. In accordance with Chiang's attempt, a significant portion of the nationalist troops deployed in this campaign were those belonged to warlords from Guangxi and Hunan. This created two serious consequences that caused the nationalist the possible victory, and the first had to do with the earlier history of the warlord era in China.

During the warlord era before World War II, the region was ravaged by the continuous fighting among the warlords of various provinces, and warlords from Guangxi and Hunan caused most damages, and was thus mostly hated by the local populace. Of course, none of the warlords had ever specifically targeted the local regions for destruction, but due to the strategic location of the area, it was destined to become the battlefield whenever the warlords were embroiled in fights for more turfs. Instead of deploying his own troops which would certainly rally more support for the nationalists, Chiang Kai-shek deployed the troops belonged to the most hated warlord cliques by the local population, Guangxi and Hunan, and allowed these warlords to dominate the region after the campaign. As a result, when the two previous nationalist blunders on the time of the offensive and the location of the offensive had turned the local populace from alienation to resentment, this third blunder had certainly turned the local population against the nationalists by driven their support firmly to the enemy side, and not only this contributed to the nationalist failure of this campaign, but it also paved the way for another nationalist defeat in the Campaign of Marching into the Dabie Mountains when enemy returned to the region a year later.

The deployment of the warlords' troops also serious hindered the nationalist attempt to eradicate the enemy in that the warlords' objectives were completely different from that of Chiang Kai-shek. In contrast to Chiang Kai-shek's objective of exterminating the enemy within the region, the warlords' objective was purely eradication instead of extermination. Due to the worry (with justification) of Chiang Kai-shek's attempt to simultaneously solve the warlord problem that had plagued China for so long and the problem of the extermination of communism together, the warlords were well aware that their own forces will be significantly reduced if they were really to fight the enemy and once the enemy were exterminated as Chiang Kai-shek had hoped, their forces would be sent elsewhere in China to fight the communists. Consequently, their power and turfs would significantly reduced or even lost completely as the military strength was diminished. On the other hand, if the enemy were allowed to escape unharmed, they would create problem for Chiang Kai-shek in other part of the China and thus Chiang would not have the resource to confront the warlords. Furthermore, as the enemy was allowed to escape unscratched in the region, Chiang Kai-shek's own troops would be forced to bear the brunt of the fighting while the warlords would consolide the power in the newly gained territories. As a result, just like in the Long March, the warlords' had never put any real effort to fight the enemy and the majority of the nationalist casualties in this campaign were among Chiang Kai-shek's own troops.

Again, Chiang Kai-shek and his followers were well aware the drawbacks of deploying warlords' troops but went on with the plan anyway, but Chiang Kai-shek did it for a reason, and in fact, a rather very good reason. As Chiang's sympathizers had accurately pointed out (and again agreed by Chiang's communist adversaries), it was already extremely difficult to convince the warlords to deploy their troops outside their own turfs into this region, and any further attempts to deploy their forces further away to exchange for Chiang's own troops being sent to this region would be impossible. As demonstrated later during the Chinese Civil War, the warlords would often simply refuse to take the commands or send their own troops during the campaigns and battles just to keep their own strength.

The last blunder the nationalists made was their infatuation with holding on to as much land as possible, which resulted in insufficient force to complete the planned mission. Although more than 300,000 nationalist troops were mobilized in this campaign, around two-thirds of them were deployed to guard the newly conquered land. As the enemy left more than half of its original strength in the region to fight the guerrilla warfare, these troops were tied down, because it was difficult to exterminate the elusive enemy and safeguard the territory at the same time when a static defense posture was adopted in order to hold on to the land. In the meantime, the remaining mobile strike force was insufficient to exterminate the main force of the enemy attempting to breakout, thus neither the extermination of the enemy nor the long-term safeguard of the newly conquered territory could be effectively achieved. Although the nationalists failed to eliminate the enemy, they did succeed in eradicating the enemy and temporarily taking the enemy base in the region, though this success was negated by the political fallouts such as failing to achieve its original objective of exterminating the enemy within the region in this first campaign of the full scale Chinese Civil War after World War II.

The communists, in contrast, did not have the dilemmas of the nationalists and benefited greatly from the nationalist blunders, and thus successfully escaped the nationalist encirclement. In carrying out their plans for the breakout, the communists successfully escaped in the directions where the nationalists totally unexpected and thus achieving surprise, and once the nationalists had realized what was happening, it was too late to redeploy their troops to make up for their misjudgements. Proportionally, the communist had suffered much greater loss because although the number of casualties are the same of both sides, the nationalists had five times more troops than the communists. However, this setback for the communists was minor in comparison to the strategic success of the breakout, and along with the Dingtao Campaign and the Central Jiangsu Campaign, this campaign was one of these three critical ones that helped to stabilize the southern front for the communists in the initial stage of the Chinese Civil War.

== See also ==
- Outline of the Chinese Civil War
- National Revolutionary Army
- History of the People's Liberation Army
