= Duan goat =

Breed of goat

The Duan goat breed from Guangxi Province in China is used for the production of meat. It has a black, white, or pied coat coloration.

== Sources ==
- Mason, Ian Lauder (2002). Porter, Valerie (ed.). Mason's world dictionary of livestock breeds, types and varieties (5th ed.). New York: CABI Publishing. ISBN 978-0-85199-430-7. OCLC 1084971069.
