= Zhongwei goat =

Breed of goat

Zhongwei
- Other names: Chung-wei, Chzhun'veiskaya
- Country of origin: China
- Distribution: Ningxia
- Use: Fiber, Pelt

Traits
- Weight: Male: 39 kg; Female: 24.5 kg
- Horn status: Horned
- Goat; Capra aegagrus hircus

The Zhongwei (Chung-wei) is a breed of goat from the Ningxia Hui Autonomous Region and Gansu Province of China. It lives on arid desert steppes, and is adapted to a diet of salty and sandy plants and shrubs. It is used primarily for the production of kid pelts, and secondarily for cashmere fiber. The breed has low genetic variability, likely due to the historic selection of pelt production traits. It is closely related to the Funiu White, Hexi Cashmere, Luliang Black, and Taihang breeds.

Males weigh 39 kg on average, and females weigh 24.5 kg on average. Both males and females grow spiral horns. The fur color is white, and occasionally black.

== Uses ==
=== Pelts ===
Kids are killed when they are 35 days old for their white, curly pelts. Zhongwei reach sexual maturity at 5–6 months of age, and are typically mated at 18 months of age with a kidding percentage of 104-106%.

=== Cashmere ===
Although they are mainly used for kid pelts, Zhongwei can be used for cashmere production. Males grow 140 g of cashmere on average and females grow 120 g on average, at a cashmere percentage of 25%, length of 7.0 cm and 12.5 microns. The quality of fur produced has declined, however, due to degradation of the land they graze on.

== See also ==
- List of goat breeds
