= Huai goat =

Breed of goat

The Huai goat breed from the region of Henan in China is used for the production of meat. They are usually white.
