= Hexi Cashmere =

Breed of goat

The Hexi Cashmere goat breed from desert and semidesert regions of the North Gansu province of China is used primarily for the production of cashmere fiber. About 60% of the goats are white. The Hexi cashmere can be found in the Gansu, Qinghai and Ningxia provinces. A typical adult doe produces 184 grams of down at 15.7 micrometres (μm) diameter.

== See also ==
- Cashmere goat

== Sources ==
- Hexi Cashmere Goat
