= List of Slovenian domestic animal breeds =

List including all Slovenian autochthonous and traditional domestic animal breeds

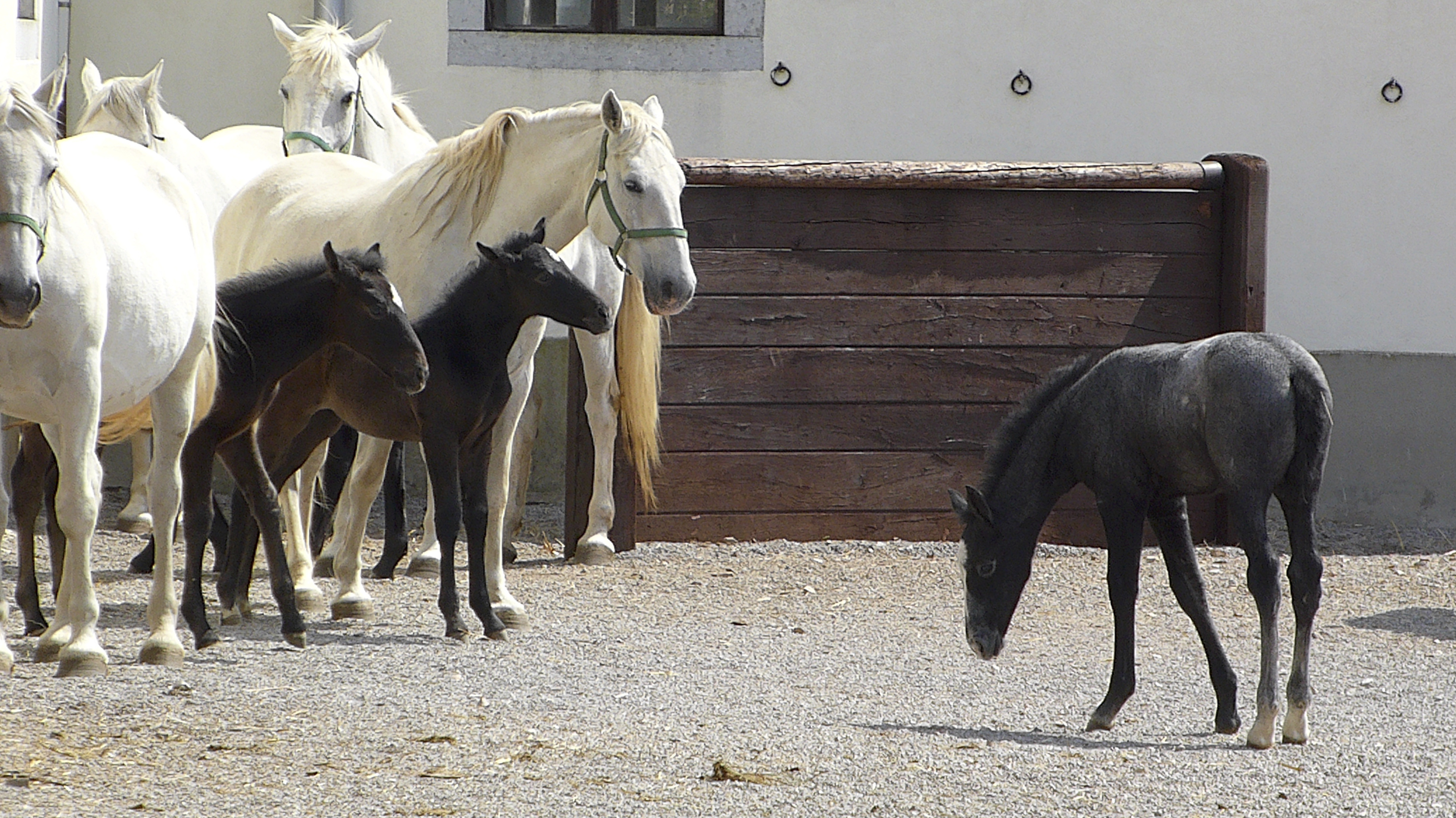
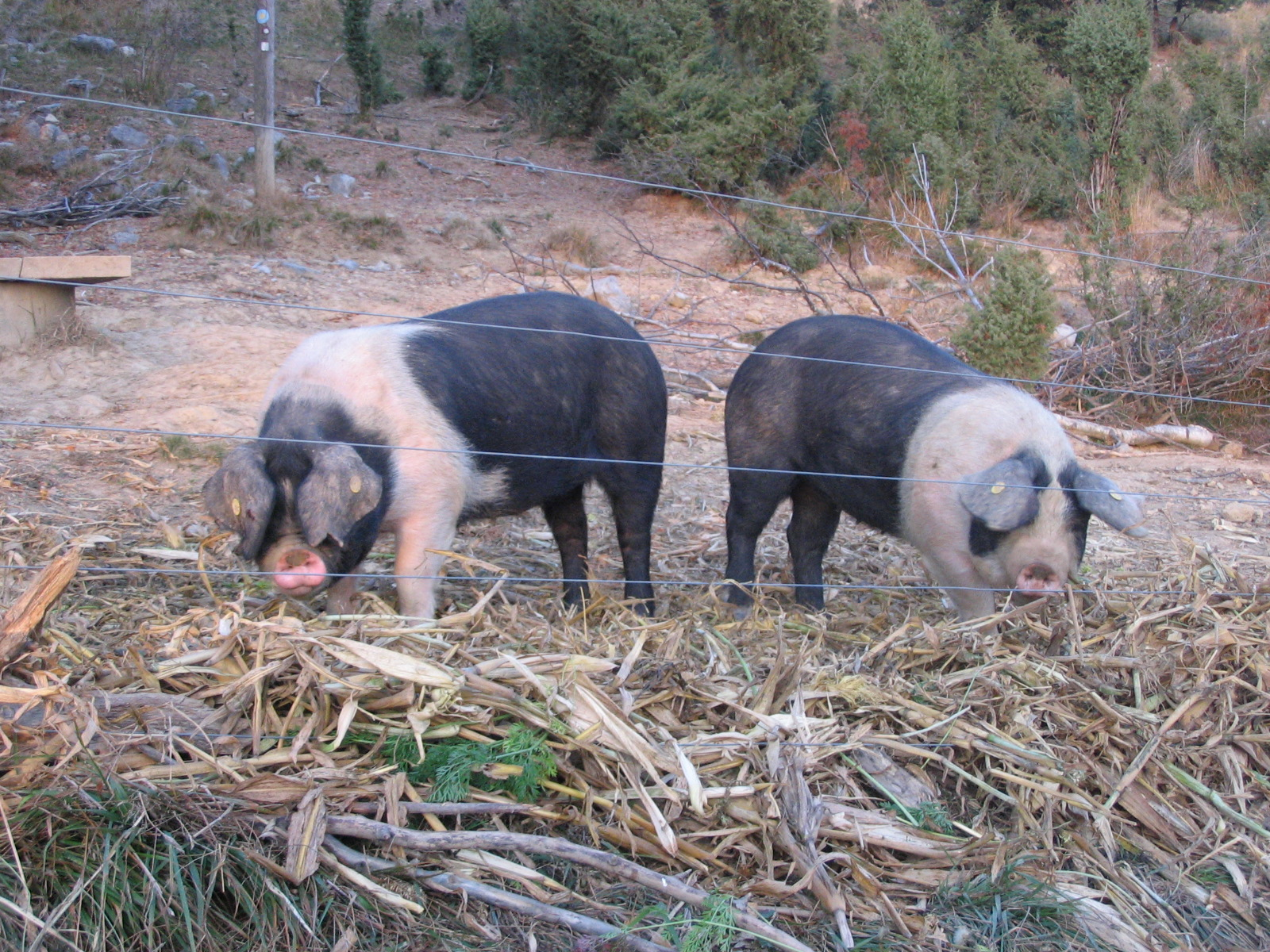
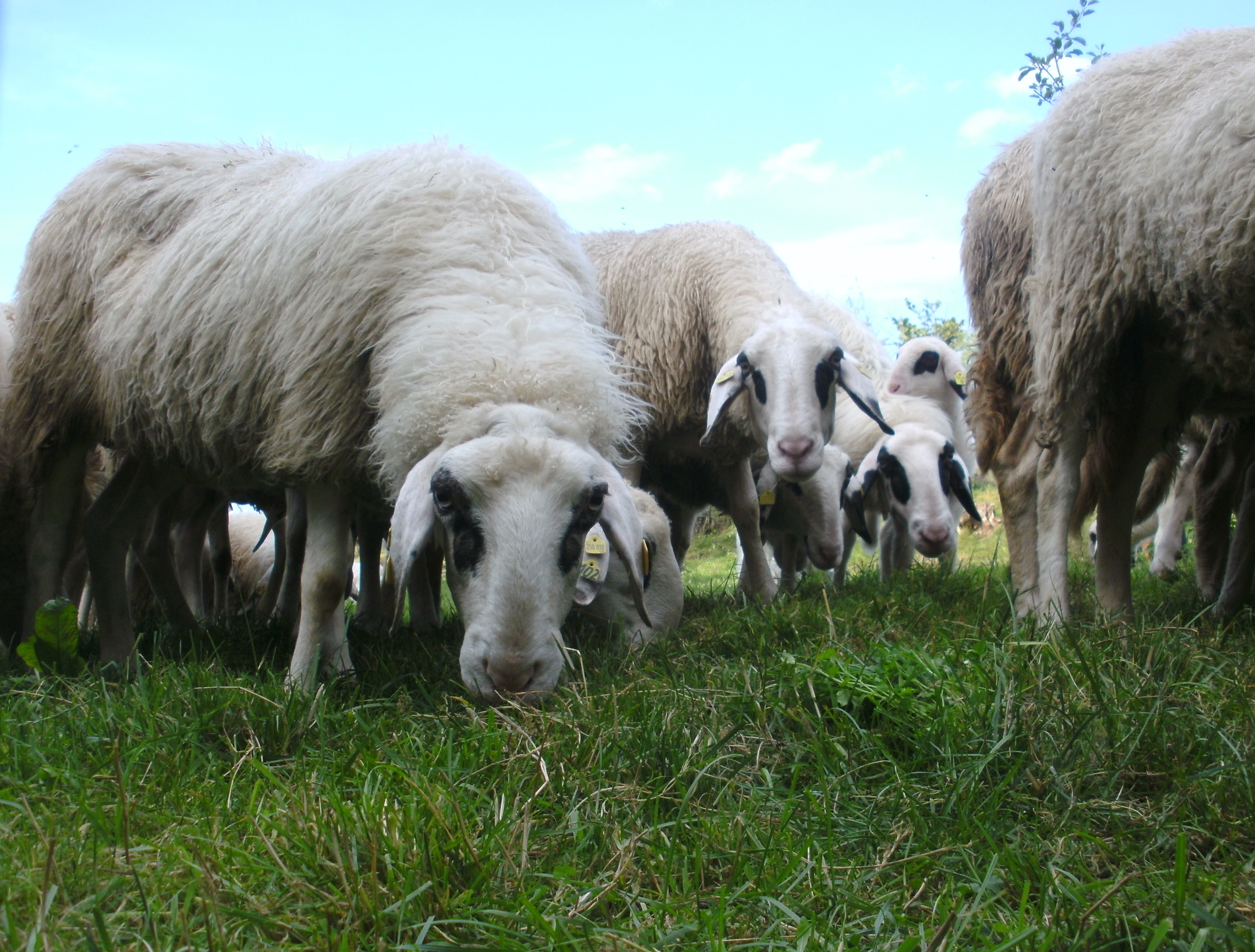
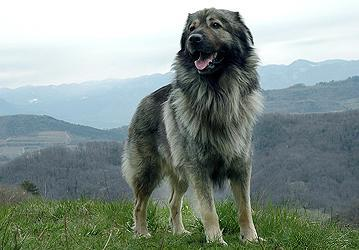
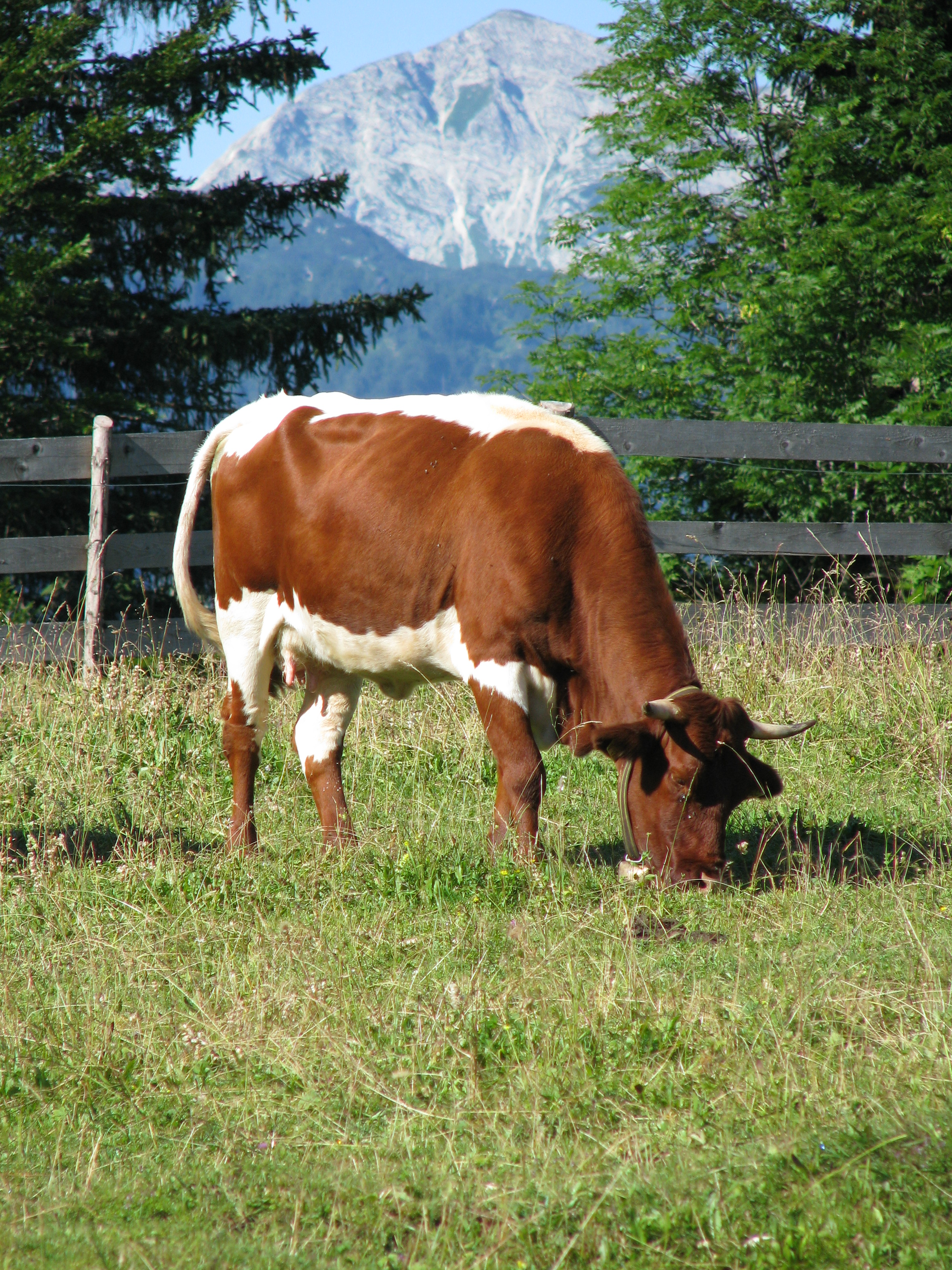
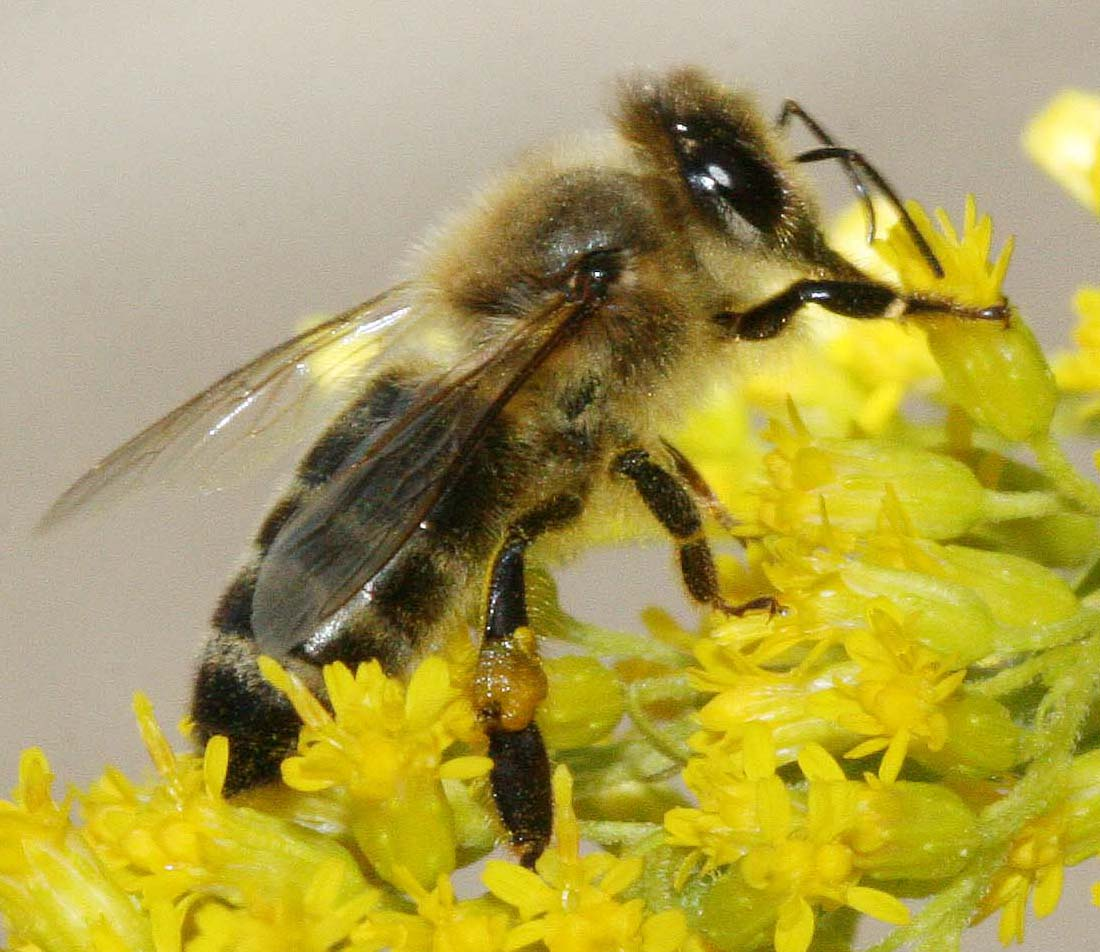
Gallery of six Slovenian autochthonous animal breeds (Lipizzan, Krškopolje pig, Jezersko-Solčava sheep, Karst Shepherd dog, Cika cattle and Carniolan bee).

List of Slovenian domestic animal breeds lists Slovenian local breeds of domesticated animals. This list includes all animal breeds that are locally adapted in Slovenia, being either autochthonous either traditional. The most widespread classification lists 15 (or 16) Slovenian autochthonous breeds, while there are 13 recognized Slovenian traditional breeds.

Slovenian autochthonous breeds are Styrian Hen, Bosnian Mountain Horse, Lipizzan, Posavac, Slovenian Cold-blood, Cika cattle, Krškopolje pig, Bela Krajina Pramenka, Bovec sheep, Jezersko-Solčava sheep, Improved Jezersko-Solčava sheep, Istrian milk, Drežnica goat, Karst Shepherd dog and Carniolan honey bee (some also include marble trout). Slovenian traditional breeds are as follows: Slovenian Barred Hen, Slovenian Brown Hen, Slovene Late-feathered Hen, Slovenian Silver Hen, Haflinger, Ljutomer Trotter, Braunvieh, Fleckvieh, Slovenian Landrace – line 11, Slovenian Landrace – line 55, Slovenian Large White, Slovenian Alpine goat and Slovenian Saanen goat.

== Division of Slovenian breeds ==
Slovenian breeds:

- Local (locally adapted) breeds
  - Autochthonous breeds
  - Traditional breeds
- Introduced breeds
  - Allochthonous breeds
  - Exotic breeds

== Autochthonous breeds ==
Autochthonous breeds are all of those domestic animal breeds that originate from the Slovenian area and have historical documents, proving their country of origin. Some autochthonous breeds are cross-border and have been developed in various countries, meaning they can be recognized as autochthonous in multiple countries.

Additional mandatory conditions, that define and determine a status of autochthonous breed, are a breed register, a breed standard and limited, as well as supervised influx of other breeds' genes. Slovenian laws require autochthonous breeds to have a breed register of at least five animal generations, bred in Slovenia. Before obtaining the status of autochthonous a breed has to have a title of traditional breed.

=== Poultry ===
English name	Local names	Scientific name	Origin	Number	Image	Notes
Styrian Hen, Altsteirer	Štajerska kokoš, štajerka, štajarska kokoš, staroštajerka, staroštajerska kokoš, celjska kokoš, kmečka kokoš, štajerska kmečka kokoš, domača šopka, štajerska deželna kokoš, hasnovita štajerska kokoš, domačegrudna kokoš, sulmtaler, sulmdolka, sulmtalka, sulmska kokoš, sulmtalska kokoš	Gallus gallus domesticus	Slovenia (mostly Slovenian Styria between rivers Mur and Sava) and Austrian state Styria	Around 1650 in Slovenia (y. 2020)		Primarily there were three colour variants: red/brown, white and barred. Red is divided into partridge-like type, reddish brown birds and wheat coloured hen. Today most of Styrian hens are of the partridge type.

=== Horses ===
English name	Local names	Scientific name	Origin	Number	Image	Notes
Bosnian Mountain Horse	Bosanski planinski konj, bosanski konj, planinski konj, domači konj	Equus caballus	Balkan Peninsula, native to countries of former Yugoslavia	Around 300 across the world		The oldest autochthonous horse breed on Balkan Peninsula. Accepted among autochthonous breeds in Slovenia despite some hesitation. To Slovenia the breed probably arrived in 15th century with Uskoks.
Lipizzan	Lipicanski konj, lipicanec	Equus caballus	Lipica, Slovenian Karst	Around 1220 in Slovenia (y. 2020)		Warmblood. Foals are black or bay. While aging horses become gray.
Posavac, Posavje horse	Posavski konj, posavec	Equus caballus	Sava, mostly Lower Sava Valley	Around 1910 in Slovenia (y. 2020)		Smaller cold-blood. Phenomenon of sexual dimorphism; stallions are more robust than mares.
Slovenian Cold-blood, Slovenian Cold-blooded Horse	Slovenski hladnokrvni konj	Equus caballus	Northeastern Slovenia and Upper Carniola	Around 3050 in Slovenia (y. 2020)		Mostly bay or black medium-sized cold-blooded horse.

=== Cattle ===
English name	Local names	Scientific name	Origin	Number	Image	Notes
Cika cattle	Cikasto govedo, cika	Bos taurus	Northwestern Slovenia (alpine regions and Bohinj)	Around 5530 in Slovenia (y. 2020)		There are two distinct geographical types; Tolmin and Bohinj Cika cattle.

=== Pigs ===
English name	Local names	Scientific name	Origin	Number	Image	Notes
Krškopolje pig, Black-belted pig	Krškopoljski prašič, črnopasasti prašič, pasasti prašič, prekasti prašič, prekec, KP	Sus scrofa domestica	Lower Carniola (mostly southeastern part)	Around 2530 in Slovenia (y. 2020)		The breed's well-known feature is a continuous pink belt, running across pig's shoulders and forelimbs. Other parts of the body are blackish.

=== Sheep ===
English name	Local names	Scientific name	Origin	Number	Image	Notes
Bela Krajina Pramenka	Belokranjska pramenka, ovca BP	Ovis aries	Near river Kolpa between Vinica, Adlešiči and Črnomelj (breed got its name after White Carniola, in Slovene language Bela krajina)	Around 1135–1200 in Slovenia (y. 2020)		Mostly black ears, black colour (spots or blotches) is also around eyes and on sheep's legs.
Bovec sheep	Bovška ovca, trentarka (in valley Trenta), ovca B	Ovis aries	Valley of Soča, Bovec, Tolmin	Around 2930–3800 in Slovenia (y. 2020)		White sheep with some black-white and brown individuals.
Improved Jezersko-Solčava sheep	Oplemenjena jezersko-solčavska ovca, ovca JSR	Ovis aries	A consequence of breeding Slovenian Jezersko-Solčava sheep with Russian Romanov sheep.	Around 92 000 in Slovenia (y. 2003), the most numerous sheep breed in Slovenia		White wool, dark individuals are a result of crossbreeding with Romanov sheep.
Istrian milk, Istrian Pramenka	Istrska pramenka, ovca IP, istrijanka, primorska ovca, ovca surove volne, kraška ovca	Ovis aries	Karst and Istria	Around 930–1100 in Slovenia (y. 2020)		Sheep are white, with blackish spots covering their trunk and head. Some animals are black. This breed's feature is a poor hairiness of animal's legs.
Jezersko-Solčava sheep	Jezersko-solčavska ovca, ovca JS	Ovis aries	Eastern regions of Slovenian Alps	Around 5150–15 000 in Slovenia (y. 2020)		Jezersko-Solčava sheep are white and often have darker area around, as well as below their eyes (so-called tear). Of black colour are also tips of sheep's ears.

=== Goats ===
English name	Local names	Scientific name	Origin	Number	Image	Notes
Drežnica goat	Drežniška koza, bovška koza, koza DR	Capra hircus	Posočje (Bovec and Drežnica)	Around 880–900 in Slovenia (y. 2020)		In the past people bred milk goats in Bovec and meat type in Drežnica.

=== Dogs ===
English name	Local names	Scientific name	Origin	Number	Image	Notes
Karst Shepherd Dog	Kraški ovčar, kraševec, ilirski ovčar	Canis familiaris	Karst	Around 820 in Slovenia (y. 2020)		Primarily livestock guardian dog. It is a member of the second FCI group (Pinscher and Schnauzer - Molossoid and Swiss Mountain and Cattledogs).

In the past Slovenian cynologists made some major contributions to breeding three additional Yugoslavian dog breeds, which were later assigned to Croatia and Montenegro by Fédération Cynologique Internationale. These breeds are Montenegrin Mountain Hound, now belonging to Montenegro, Posavac Hound and Istrian Hound (Coarse-haired and Short-haired) – both owned by Croatia.

=== Other ===
English name	Local names	Scientific name	Origin	Number	Image	Notes
Carniolan honey bee	Kranjska čebela, kranjska sivka, kranjica, koroška čebela, karnika, noriška čebela, sivka	Apis mellifera carnica	Carniola	Around 12 500 beehives, 40 000 purebreed queens and 90 000 bee families in Slovenia		Carniolan bee has a status of a subspecies of honey bee. It is also treated as a breed.

Some classifications of Slovenian autochthonous breeds also include marble trout (Salmo marmoratus).

English name	Local names	Scientific name	Origin	Number	Image	Notes
Marble trout	Soška postrv	Salmo marmoratus/ Salmo trutta marmoratus	Endemic species of Jadran river basin (mostly Soča)			There are two distinct colour types; trouts of Zadlaščica type are marbled, while type Idrijca fish also possess red spots. Often a lot of red dots can be found covering fish's lateral line.

== Traditional breeds ==
Unlike an autochthonous breed a Slovenian traditional breed does not originate from the Slovenian area (it is of foreign origin). However a traditional breed has a long history of breeding in the region of Republic of Slovenia.

The Official Gazette, number 77/04, titled List of autochthonous and traditional breeds of domestic animals, requires Slovenian traditional breeds to be continuously bred by Slovenian breeders for at least 30 years (for poultry, pigs, sheep, goats and cattle) or 50 years (for other species). Another mandatory condition is an existence of breed register that proves a breed is being raised in Slovenia for at least 5 generations.

An additional requirement is a proper breed's name; a Slovenian traditional breed should have the word "slovenska" ("Slovenian") or a name of any other Slovene human settlement in its name.

=== Poultry ===
English name	Local names	Scientific name	Origin	Number	Image	Notes
Slovenian Barred Hen	Slovenska grahasta kokoš, SGK	Gallus gallus domesticus	Bred on the Department of Animal Science, BF UL, from Barred and White Plymouth Rock	Around 1270 in Slovenia (y. 2020)		Serves for a production of commercial chicken. When cross-breeding a hen of the Slovenian Barred and a rooster of the Slovenian Brown the result is so-called Prelux-Č (prelux črna in Slovenian, Prelux Black in English). Prelux-G (prelux grahasta in Slovenian, Prelux Barred in English) is a consequence of breeding a rooster of the Slovenian Barred with a hen of the Slovenian Brown. Mostly used for egg production (light type).
Slovenian Brown Hen	Slovenska rjava kokoš, SRK	Gallus gallus domesticus	Bred on the Department of Animal Science, BF UL, from American chicken breed Rhode Island Red	Around 2910 in Slovenia (y. 2020)		Serves for a production of commercial chicken. So-called Prelux-R (prelux rjava in Slovenian, Prelux Brown in English) is a consequence of crossbreeding a hen of the Slovenian Silver with a rooster of the Slovenian Brown. When cross-breeding a hen of the Slovenian Barred and a rooster of the Slovenian Brown the result is so-called Prelux-Č. Prelux-G is a consequence of breeding a rooster of the Slovenian Barred with a hen of the Slovenian Brown. Mostly used for egg production (light type).
Slovene Late-feathered Hen, Slovenian Slow Feathering Hen	Slovenska pozno operjena kokoš, SPOK	Gallus gallus domesticus	Bred on the Department of Animal Science, BF UL, from American White Plymouth Rock	Around 340 in Slovenia (y. 2020)		Serves for a production of broilers (so-called Prelux-BRO). Heavy chicken breed.
Slovenian Silver Hen	Slovenska srebrna kokoš, SSK	Gallus gallus domesticus	Bred on the Department of Animal Science, BF UL, from multiple chicken breeds	Around 920 in Slovenia (y. 2020)		Serves for a production of commercial chicken. So-called Prelux-R is a consequence of crossbreeding a hen of the Slovenian Silver with a rooster of the Slovenian Brown. Mostly used for egg production (light type).

In the past the Slovene Early-feathered Hen and Slovenian Fathering Hen were also included among Slovenian traditional breeds of domestic animals. In 2013 financial problems caused both breeds to be removed from the list of Slovenian heavy locally adapted chicken breeds, making the Slovene Late-feathered Hen the only currently listed breed.

=== Horses ===
English name	Local names	Scientific name	Origin	Number	Image	Notes
Haflinger	Haflinški konj, haflinger	Equus caballus	Tyrol	Around 300 000 across the world, around 570 in Slovenia (l. 2020)		The breed is a results of breeding Arabians with Alpine mares.
Ljutomer Trotter	Ljutomerski kasač, ljutomerec	Equus caballus	Ljutomer	Around 400 in Slovenia (y. 2020)		Some Slovenian experts think Ljutomer Trotter meets all the criteria needed for obtaining the status of a Slovenian autochthonous breed.

=== Cattle ===
English name	Local names	Scientific name	Origin	Number	Image	Notes
Braunvieh, Slovenian Brown, Brown Swiss	Rjavo govedo, slovensko rjavo govedo, sivka, sivorjavo govedo	Bos taurus	Switzerland, Austrian states Vorarlberg and Tyrol, German Bavaria	Around 23 000 in Slovenia (y. 2020)		Brown to gray dairy cow. This breed's feature is a pronounced chest.
Fleckvieh	Lisasto govedo	Bos taurus	Western Switzerland, originating from Swiss Simmental cattle	More than 200 000 in Slovenia (y. 2020)		Typical brown cows with white blotches.

=== Pigs ===
English name	Local names	Scientific name	Origin	Number	Image	Notes
Slovenian Landrace – line 11	Slovenska landrace – linija 11, slovenski landrace linija 11, švedska landrace, švedska landras	Sus scrofa domestica	Sweden, Norway and Denmark	Around 4890 in Slovenia (y. 2020)		Middle-sized white pigs, raised for giving meat.
Slovenian Landrace – line 55	Slovenska landrace – linija 55, nemška landrace, nemška landras	Sus scrofa domestica	Germany	Around 45 in Slovenia (y. 2020)		The breed's feature is high growth capacity.
Slovenian Large White	Slovenski veliki beli prašič, large white, Yorkshire, Edelschwein, veliki jorkšir, slovenska velika bela (linija 22)	Sus scrofa domestica	Great Britain	Around 870 in Slovenia (y. 2020)		White breed of big pigs.

=== Goats ===
English name	Local names	Scientific name	Origin	Number	Image	Notes
Slovenian Alpine goat	Slovenska srnasta koza, koza SR	Capra hircus	Alps	Around 15 800 in Slovenia (y. 2003), the most numerous goat breed in Slovenia		Goats were improved with different Alpine breeds from Germany and France. Animals are of various colours; from gray to light and dark shades of brown. Slovenian Alpine goat's well-known feature is a black line running across an animal's back.
Slovenian Saanen goat	Slovenska sanska koza, koza SA	Capra hircus	Valley Saanen in Switzerland	Around 4700 in Slovenia (y. 2003)		White breed, which is a result of crossbreeding a couple of Slovenian goats and Swiss Saanen goat.
