= Cika cattle =

Slovenian cattle breed

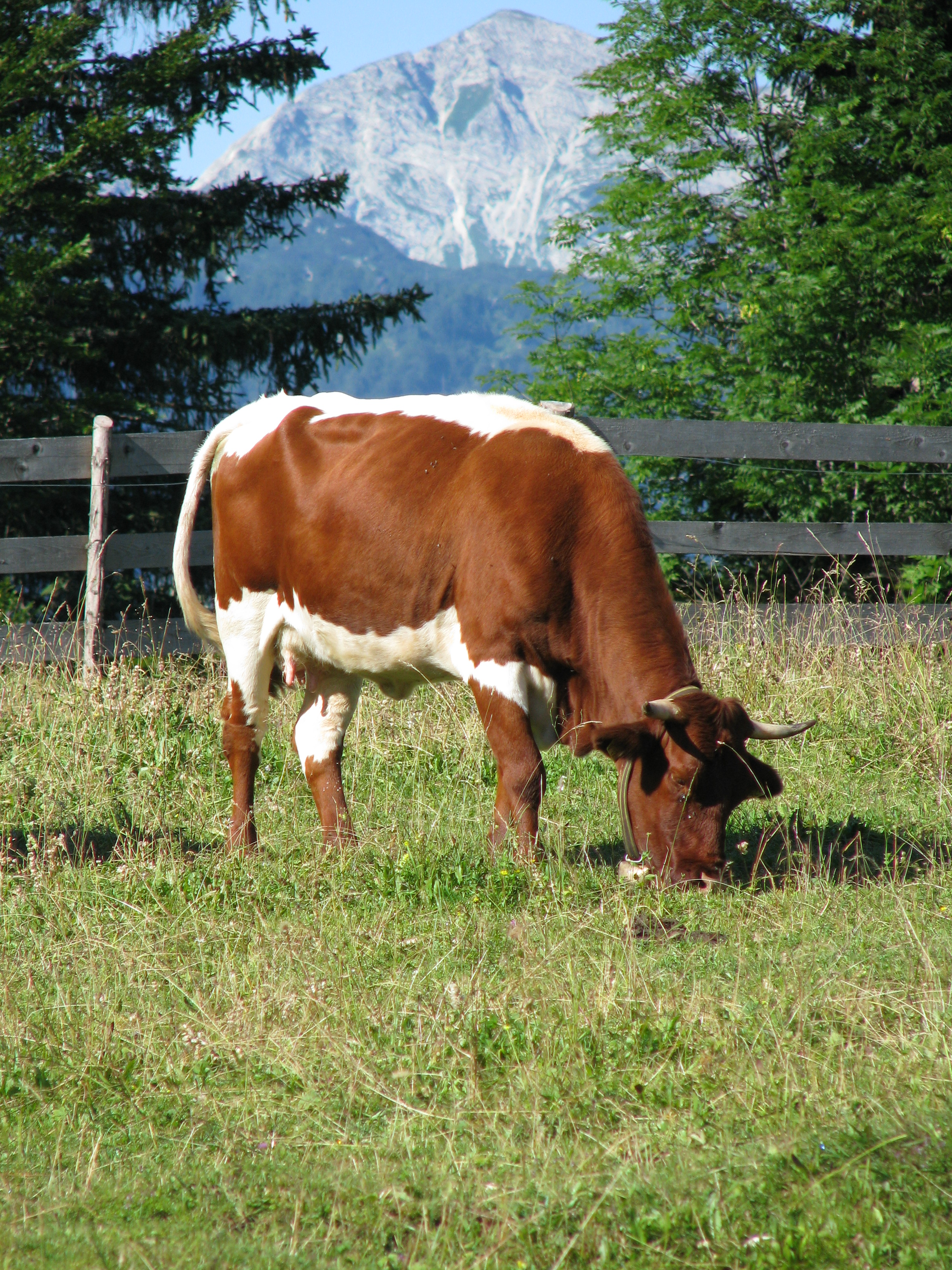
- Conservation status: at risk
- Other names: Slovenian Cika; Slovene: Cikasto govedo; Cika
- Country of origin: Slovenia
- Distribution: Slovenia
- Standard: Breed standard for Cika cattle (in Slovene)
- Use: dairy cow

Traits
- Weight: Male: 550 kg; Female: 470 kg
- Height: Male: 136 cm; Female: 126 cm
- Coat: red to chestnut brown, usually with white lines
- Horn status: 2 thin horns

Notes
- A breed, originally bred for dairy products, with some adults and calves serving as beef cows
- Cattle; Bos (primigenius) taurus

Cika cattle (Slovene: Cikasto govedo or cika) is an autochthonous breed of cattle, originating in Slovenia. This red to chestnut brown cow is used to grazing on alpine pastures and was traditionally raised to serve as a dairy cow – giving people milk and taking care of calves. The Slovenian Cika is the only Slovenian autochthonous breed of cattle.

== Origin and distribution ==
This Slovenian breed of cattle is originating from northwestern alpine regions of Slovenia. One of the most important places, associated with a development of Cika cattle breed, is the Slovenian basin named Bohinj. The latter is well-known for being a center of alpine shepherding of Slovenia. There are two distinct geographical types; Tolmin and Bohinj Cika cattle.

At first the Slovenian Cika cattle was the most numerous cattle breed in Slovenia, especially widespread in alpine regions of northwestern Slovenia. Around year 1964 breeders introduced foreign cattle breeds, such as Germanic Fleckvieh and Braunvieh (Swiss brown), which led to a dramatic decrease of Cika cattle populations, almost causing the breed to go extinct.

After some given effort the breed recovered and nowadays Cika cattle is being raised in almost all regions of Slovenia, with the biggest populations being present in Upper Carniola Statistical Region, Savinja Statistical Region and Central Slovenia Statistical Region. There is thought to be around 5530 individuals of Cika cattle in year 2020, with population's size increasing. For comparison, there were only about 900 cows of Cika breed in year 2003. In 2011 there were 736 registered breeders, with a majority having only one animal of this breed on their farm.

== Description ==
=== Appearance ===
The breed is characterised by relatively small framed and lightweight cows with monochrome head, pink coloured wide muzzle and thin horns, which are directed upwards. Cows of this breed usually have red to chestnut brown coat with a continuous white line, which covers the middle part of animal's back, thighs, belly, chest and shank. In some individuals the white belt is less visible and thinner, sometimes also missing.

=== Features and usage ===
This breed of cattle is used to grazing on various alpine meadows, including steep, rocky and almost inaccessible pastures. These relatively undemanding cows are known for having good fertility, strongly expressed maternal instincts and long lifespan.

Cika cattle is characterised by high milk yield and is primarily used as a dairy cow (for production of milk and dairy products, such as cheese, quark and yogurt), with some individuals being bred as beef cows. In some cases adult female cows of this breed are used for raising calves, that are meant to be slaughtered for obtaining meat. Bulls of Slovenian Cika are also very useful for meat industry because of their relatively thin bones, meaning the percentage of available meat is higher.

== Gallery ==
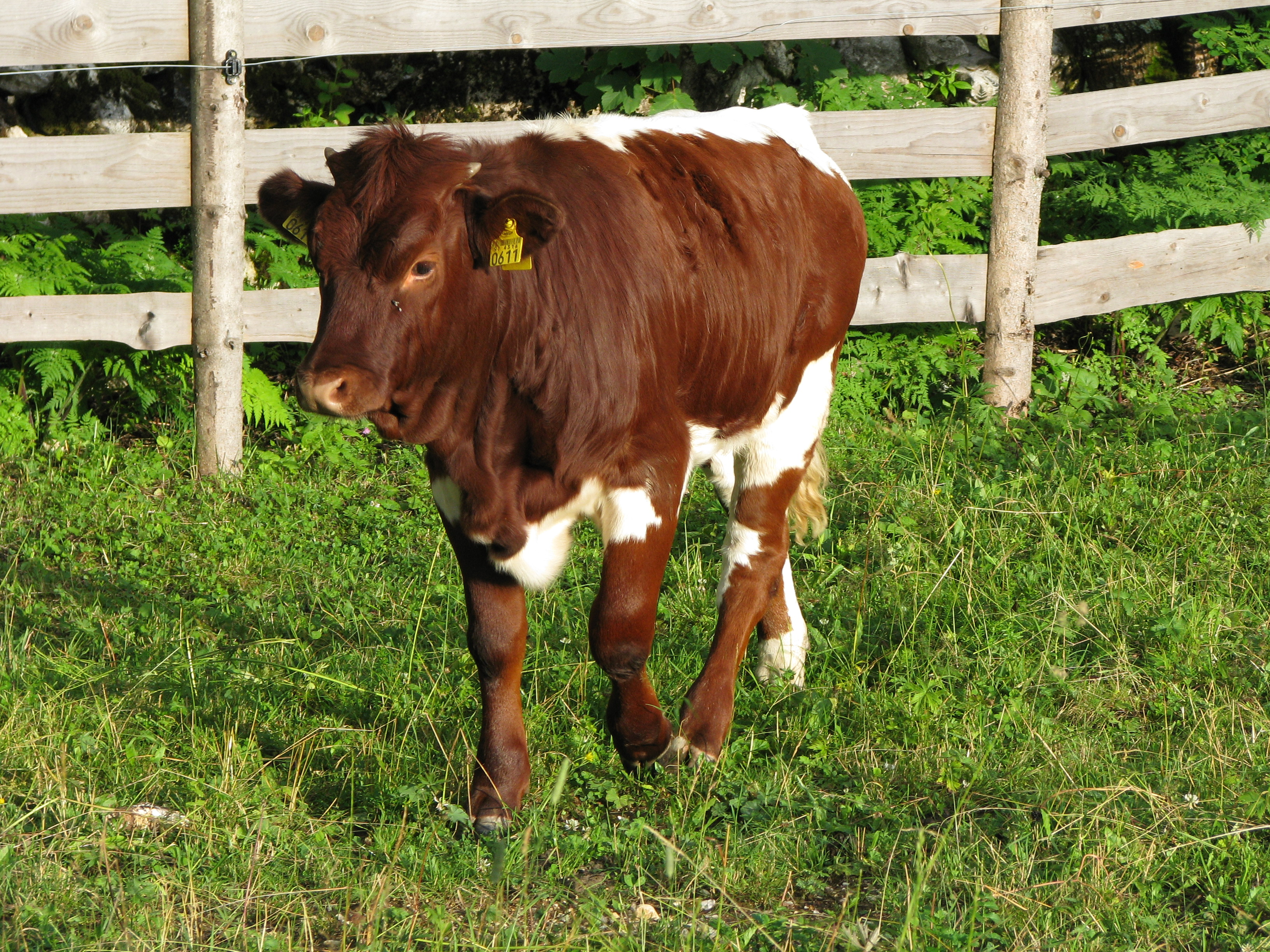

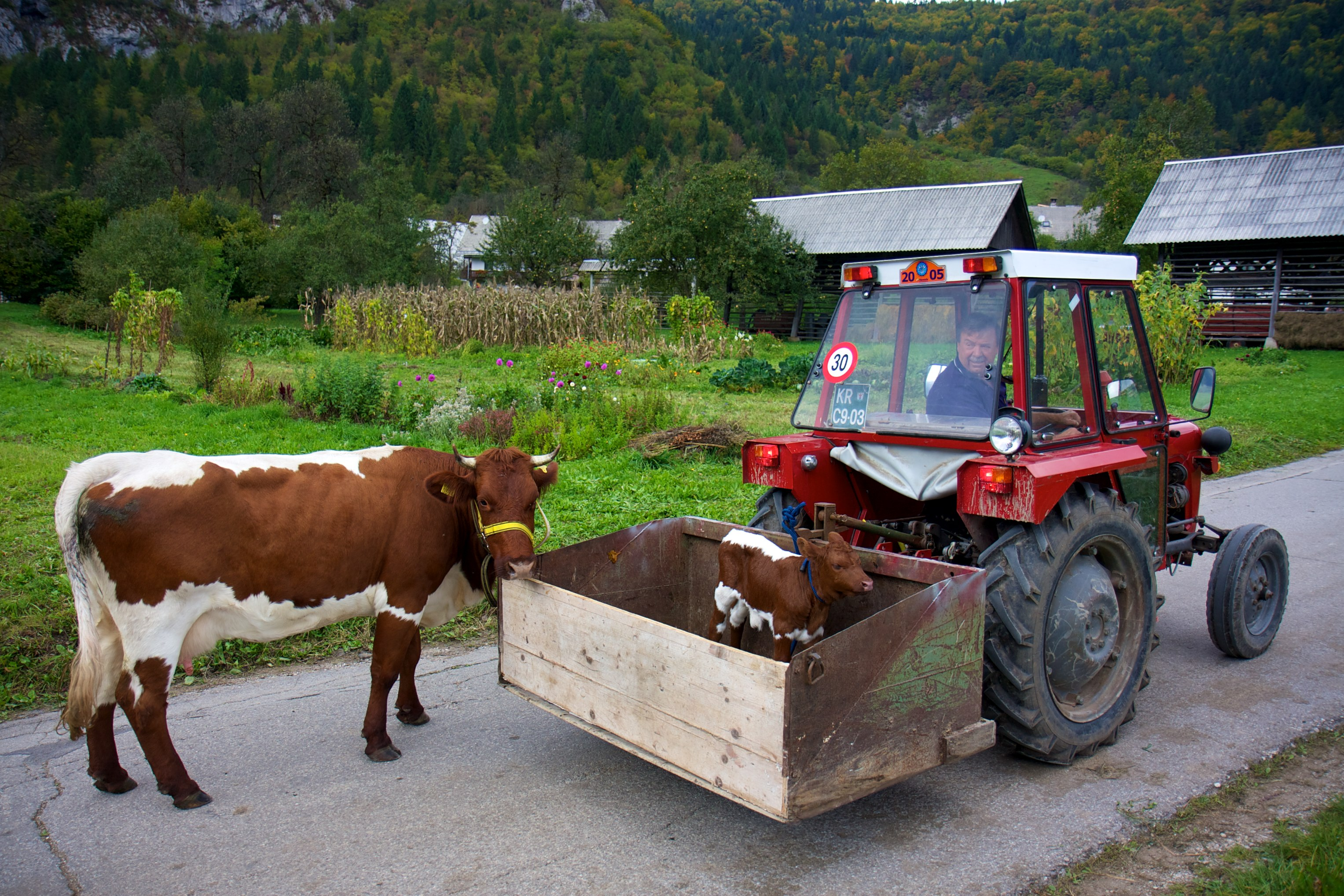

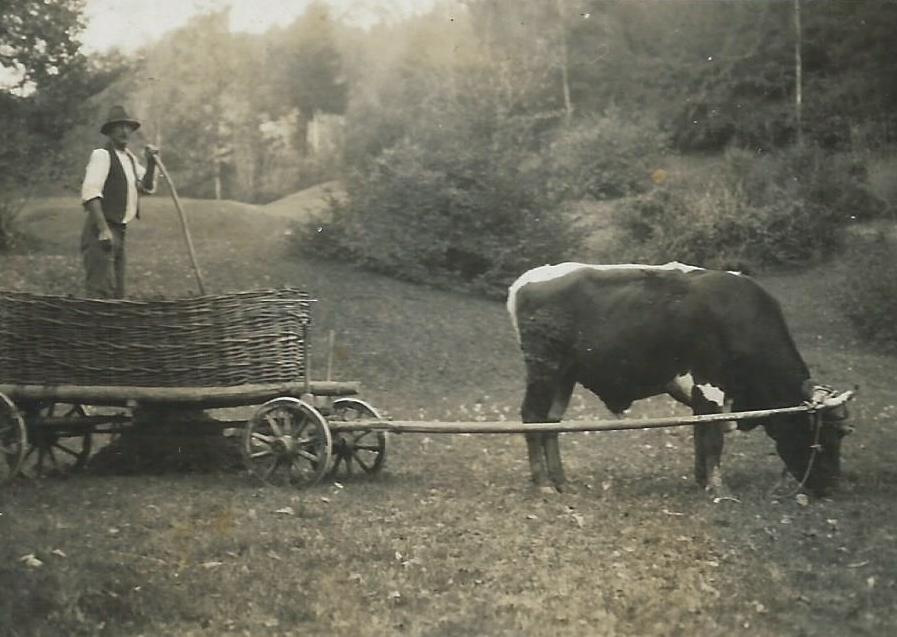

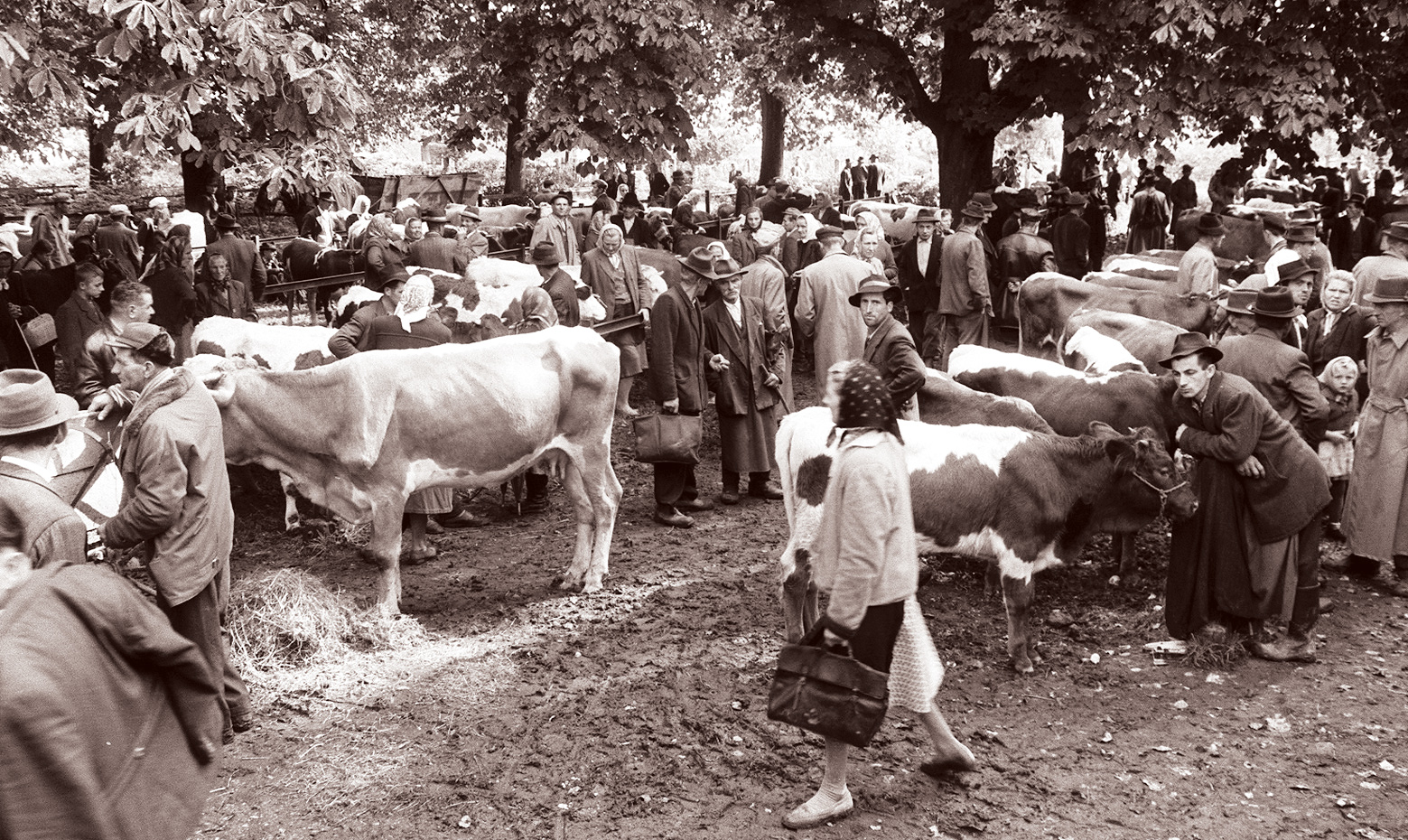

== See also ==
- List of Slovenian domestic animal breeds
- List of cattle breeds
