= Krškopolje pig =

Slovenian pig breed

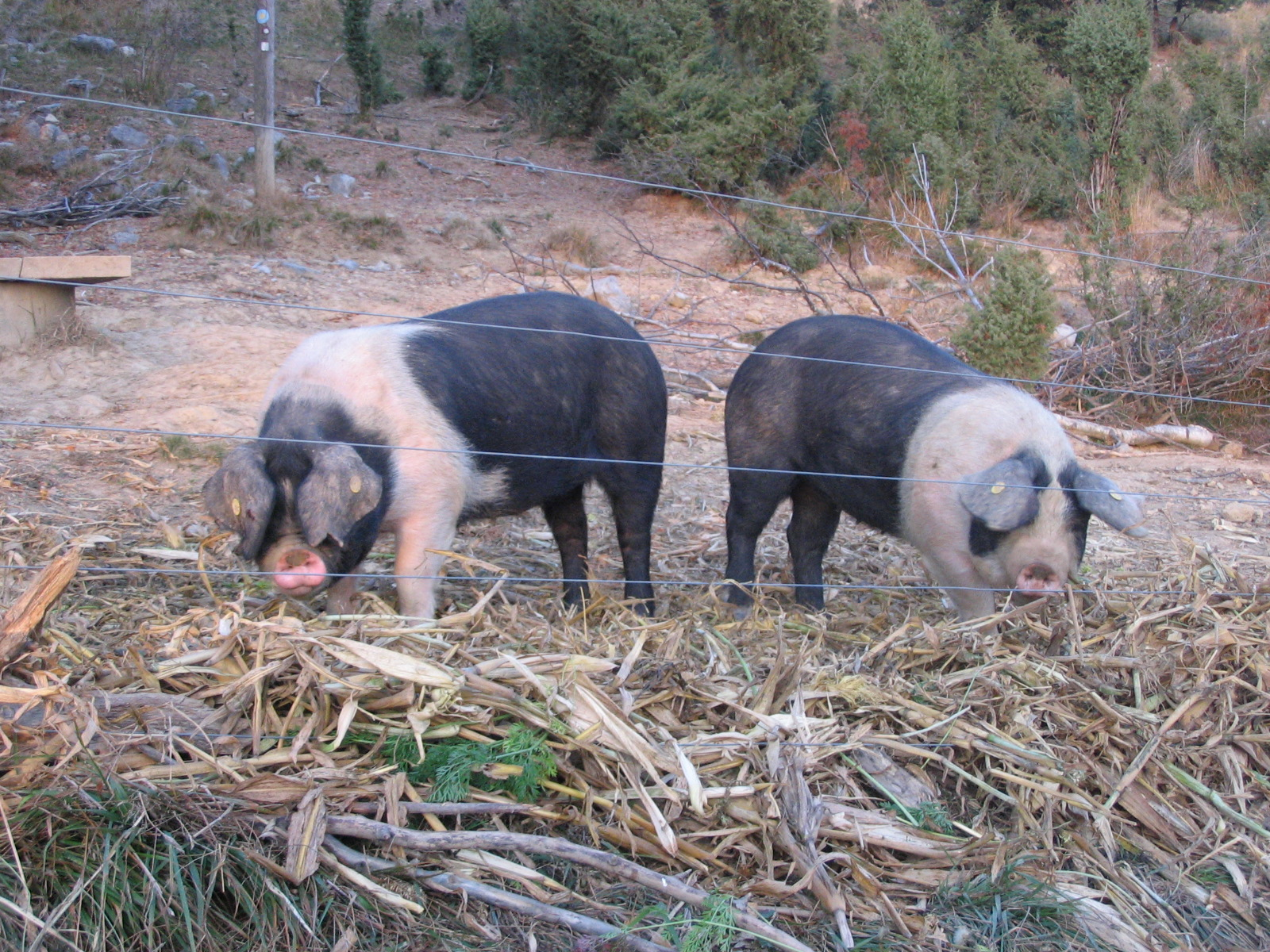
- Conservation status: endangered
- Other names: Black-belted pig; Slovene: Krškopoljski prašič
- Country of origin: Slovenia
- Distribution: Slovenia
- Standard: Breed standard in Slovenian
- Use: meat, bacon, dried meat products

Traits
- Weight: Male: 280 kg; Female: 230 kg
- Height: Male: 152 cm; Female: 140 cm
- Hair: multicoloured: mostly black, with white/pink saddle

Krškopolje pig or Black-belted pig (Slovene: Krškopoljski prašič) is an autochthonous breed of pig, originating in Slovenia. This pig represents the only still preserved Slovenian autochthonous breed of domestic pig. The easily recognizable blackish Krškopolje pig, widely used for meat production, is well known for its continuous pink belt, running across animal's shoulders and forelimbs.

== Origin and distribution ==
The breed's area of origin are southeastern parts of Lower Carniola, especially Krško-Brežiško field, but also the foothills of Žumberak Mountains. The earliest documents regarding the Krškopolje pig are from 19th century, with the breed's naming and first comprehensive description written by Slovenian agricultural expert Viljem Rohrman and published in newspaper Kmetijske in rokodelske novice in 1899. Among other mentioned facts Rohrman pointed out that pigs from Slovenian Krško field are very uniform and easily separable from pigs of other breeds. Lack of any systematic breeding and uncontrolled crossing of the Krškopolje pig with Yorkshire breed led to pig farming expert and priest Anton Oblak announcing in year 1938 that original breed is almost extinct, as true, purebred pigs of the Krškopolje breed can be found only in rural areas. There was also some deliberate crossing with other foreign breeds, such as Small Black pig (Suffolk), Berkshire pig, German Sattelschwein and a few others.

Like numerous other old breeds of extensively reared farm animals the Krškopolje pig became endangered after the end of Second World War as new, intensively reared breeds were being implemented, its breeding area had shrunk and number of breeding boars decreased. Despite low numbers of animals a couple of important research papers were published after the World War II, regarding the breed's fertility, growing potential and slaughter yield. Around 1960 the official campaign against the breed started, resulting in decreasing number of pigs. Following a period of neglect from 1971 onwards, the breed's register was started in 1992, at first including only three family farms, which started with pedigree and performance recording. Eventually the breed recovered to some extent, with interest for rearing Krškopolje increasing since 2003 (partly as a consequence of subsidies for autochthonous breeds and growing interest for ecological farming), and today it is being raised in all regions of Slovenia, yet most farms have only a few pigs and a third of farmers is rearing just one pig. Based on the data from year 2020 there are around 2530 animals, with the breed's population being labeled as stable. The breed's herdbook includes more than 400 breeding sows and almost 80 breeding boars.

== Appearance ==
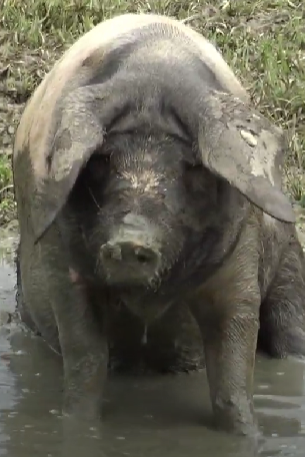
An adult pig in mud

The Krškopolje is a breed of black middle-sized pigs, easily recognizable because of their continuous white to pink belt, running across animal's shoulders and forelimbs – the so-called saddle. Usually animals have their snouts covered with pink colour. Their strong bristles (hair) are straight, as well as dark on black parts of a pig's body. A typical pig has a middle-sized head, concave nose profile and looped ears of medium length. A wide trunk is not too deep, a pig's back is wide, straight and long, while its strong shoulders are closed and broad thighs (hams) full and deep.

On average boars weigh 280 kg and sows 230 kg. When measured from the tip of the nose to the start of the tail, adult males reach 152 cm and adult females 140 cm of average body length. At withers boars are 87 cm and sows 83 cm; reaching 63 cm, head is longer in males (females' head is approximately 30 cm long), while tails are of similar length, in boars 45 cm and sows 41 cm. Sows have 14 teats.

== Breeding and usage ==
The Black-belted pig is a breed of extensively reared pigs, usually placed mainly in barns and partly on pastures. The relatively undemanding breed with large appetite is adapted to poor circumstances, with animals being resistant, moderately fertile, even-tempered and with well-pronounced maternal instincts. A typical sow has 1,8 litters in one year, each containing 8.1–10.5 piglets. Relatively common problems associated with the breed's reproductive habits are stillborn piglets (percentage is variable, usually in range between 5.7 and 21.9 %), high inbreeding and lack of breeding boars.

Pigs of this breed are intended for providing quality meat with a lot of (especially intramuscular) pig fat and bacon. Pork can be used directly as a roast pork or processed as dried meat products, such as salami, sausage, prosciutto and bacon, the latter often being processed further into bacon jam and pork rind. In the past, meat of Krškopolje was often used when making the Carniolan sausage. In ideal farming conditions young piglets – the so-called fatteners gain around 1 kg per day. Slaughter yield is estimated to be somewhat under 80 %, with lean meat content reaching between 40 and 45 %.

== Gallery ==
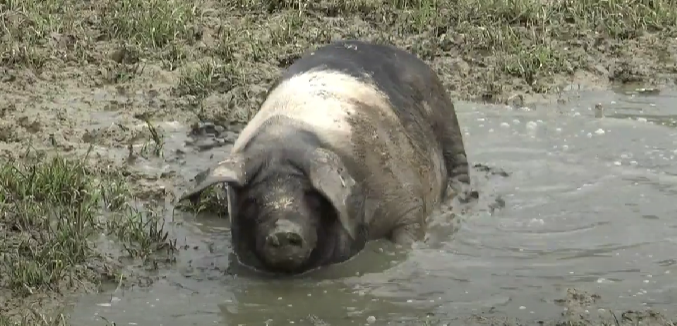

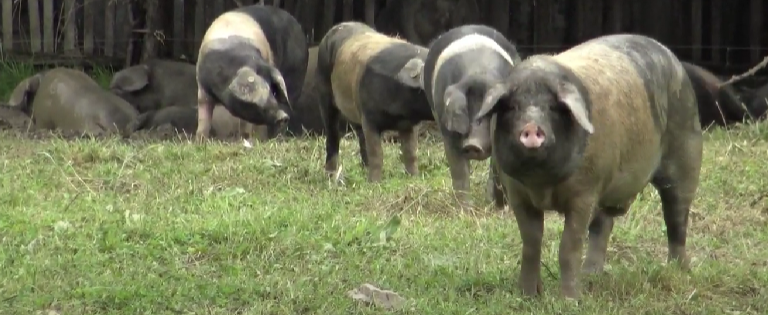

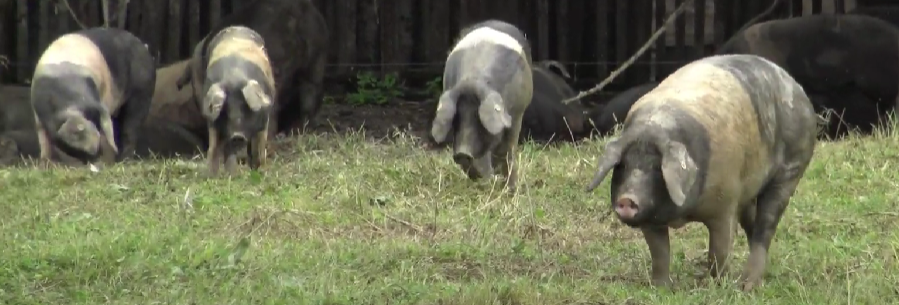

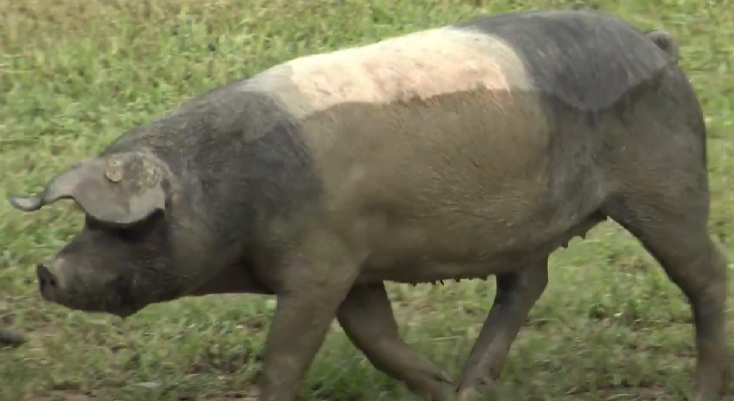

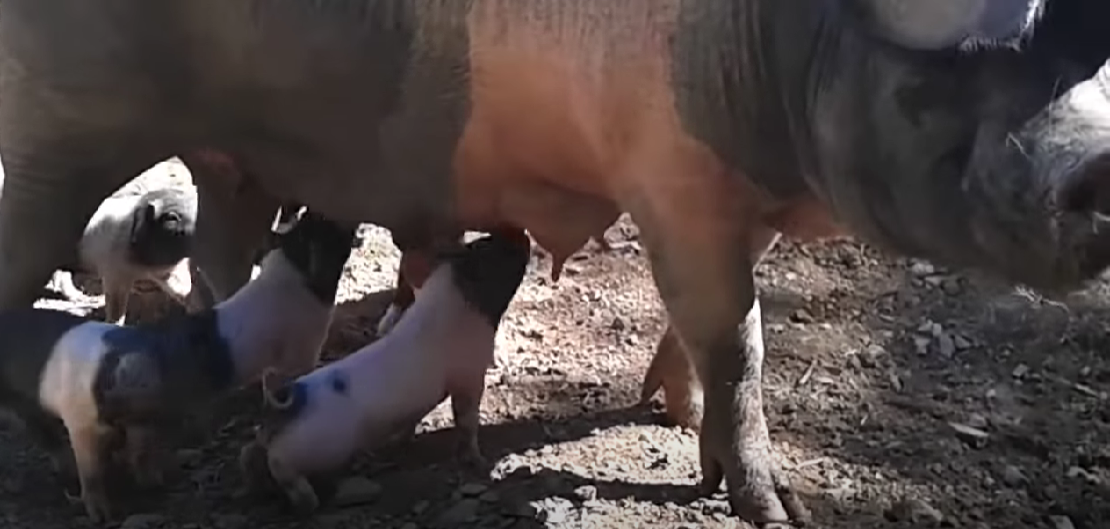

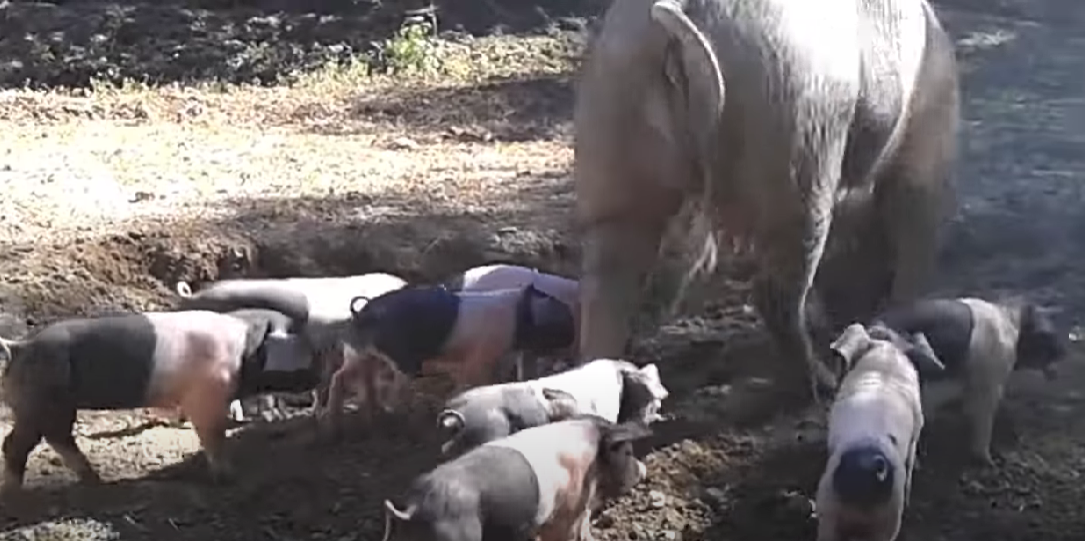

== See also ==
- List of Slovenian domestic animal breeds
- List of pig breeds
