= Drežnica goat =

Slovenian goat breed

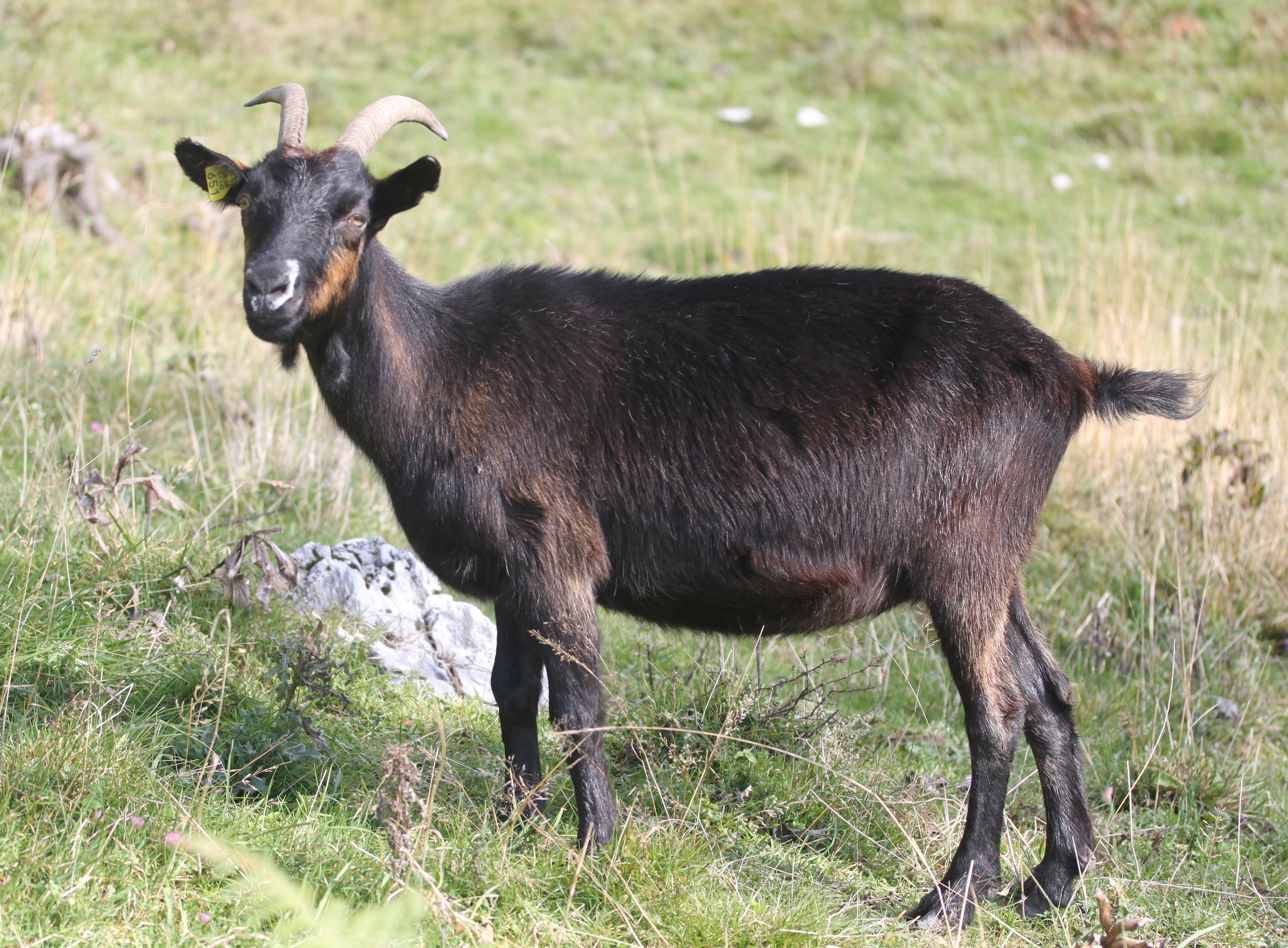
- A typical black-brown (so-called sajasta) representative of the breed
- Other names: Slovene: Drežniška koza; Bovška koza
- Country of origin: Slovenia
- Distribution: Slovenia
- Use: milk and meat

Traits
- Weight: Male: 65–80; Female: 45–60
- Height: Male: 65–75; Female: 60–70
- Coat: mainly dark, especially black and black-brown, various other colours are possible
- Horn status: horned
- Beard: bearded
- Tassels: with tassels
- Goat; Capra aegagrus hircus

The Drežnica (Slovene: drežniska koza or bovška koza) is a Slovenian autochthonous breed of domestic goat originating in the Posočje region of north-west Slovenia. It is the only goat breed listed among Slovenian either autochthonous either traditional breeds of domestic animals. Animals of this breed are middle-sized darker goats, that are being used both for production of milk and dairy products as well as obtaining goat meat.

== Origin and distribution ==
The Drežnica is a breed originating in northwestern Slovenia, on the area of Posočje, specifically places Drežnica and Bovec. The breed got its name after the village Drežnica, while some people call these goats Bovec goat. Today the Drežnica goat is the most widespread on the area of its origin, mostly around Bovec and Drežnica, in Tolmin and in smaller herds also elsewhere in Slovenia.

The breed was strongly influenced by the neglected role of goat farming as a discipline of animal husbandry. Past governments of Slovenian area were restricting or prohibiting goat grazing on some parts of Slovenia; consequently an organized and systematic breeding of the Drežnica goat was not possible for a long time. A huge hit for the breed was the Second World War, when the numbers of the Drežnica goat declined critically. Today there is thought to be between 880 and 900 goats of this breed (y. 2020), with population's trend being stable. The official register includes 722 selected breeding females and 101 selected breeding males in 2021.

== Features ==
Goats of this breed are of medium frame, with bucks in average weighing from 65 to 80 kg and reaching from 65 to 75 cm of height, while does weigh from 45 to 60 kg and in average reach from 60 to 70 cm. Males are known for their forehead ponytail and a pronounced, long beard, that is also a feature of some females. On a robust, convexly profiled head with short ears are in most cases (always in bucks, sometimes also in does) horns that occasionally reach one metre of length. A goat's hooves are firm and enable safe climbing even on steep rocks.

=== Coat colours ===
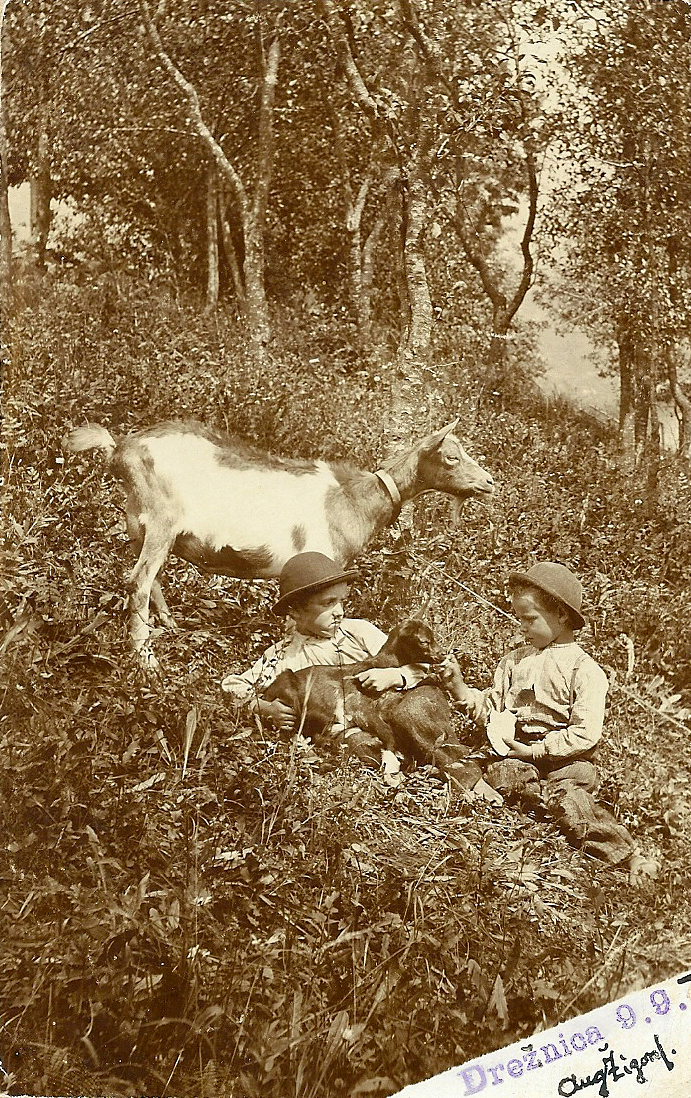
Drežnica goat on the old postcard

The breed is known for having diverse range of coat colours, with darker pelts being the most common; a majority of animals is either black (1/3 of the population) either black-brown, less common goats are gray-black, brown, yellow-brown, black with white blotches on the head or patterns on the trunk and white with black blotches. Occasionally goat's back and thighs are covered with longer fur. Slovenian breeders use special terminology for referring to distinct coat colours: some goats are said to be rumene (goats with orange fur), golobaste (front part light, rear part dark), vajsaste or bajsaste (mostly white), zelene (goats with the so-called gray pattern, meaning there is white or gray hair among black fur), sajaste (black-brown or brown), zelena plista (animals are black or gray-black and have a "flower" on their forehead), pirnjaste or blekaste (white goats with black blotches), cimbaste (goats that have their back and thighs covered with longer hair), ribaste (black goats with brown neck), cevnjaste (long-haired) and gamsaste (mostly brown). Some experts think that such diversity of a coat colour is a consequence of breeding females of the Drežnica goat with bucks of other breeds.

== Breeding and usage ==
The Drežnica goat is usually bred in a traditional (extensive) way, with animals grazing on pastures on hills and mountains during a favourable part of the year. Goats are used to harder conditions of montane pasture and are able to thrive even in poor circumstances, as they can get food from steep and hardly accessible lands. During winter goats are being kept in stables and fed with hay. Goat grazing is thought to be beneficial for montane ecosystems as animals are preventing overgrowth of pastures.

The breed is divided into two types based on the usage: meat and milk type. Goats of the meat type, which are usually less fertile (average number of born juveniles is 1.07), have strong bones, are robust and muscular, are a feature of lands near Drežnica, while more fertile (average number of born juveniles is 1.36) and less robust animals of the milk type are more common in vicinities of Bovec. Goats of the milk type have darker udder with non-equal number of teats, while goats of the meat type are characterised by a small udder and short teats. As Drežnica goats used for obtaining meat are spending less time with people, they are more lively and have a more pronounced temperament. Meat goats are being raised for their kids, while milk goats are also used for providing milk (an average milkiness in lactation is 360 kg, with some animals reaching 500 kg), which is often used for making goat cheese, known as the Bovec cheese. Milk of the Drežnica goat consists of 4.3 % fat and 3.4 % protein. Often milk of cows and sheep is also used for a production of this cheese, with whey and ricotta as byproducts.

== See also ==
- List of Slovenian domestic animal breeds
- List of goat breeds
