= Altsteirer =

Chicken breed

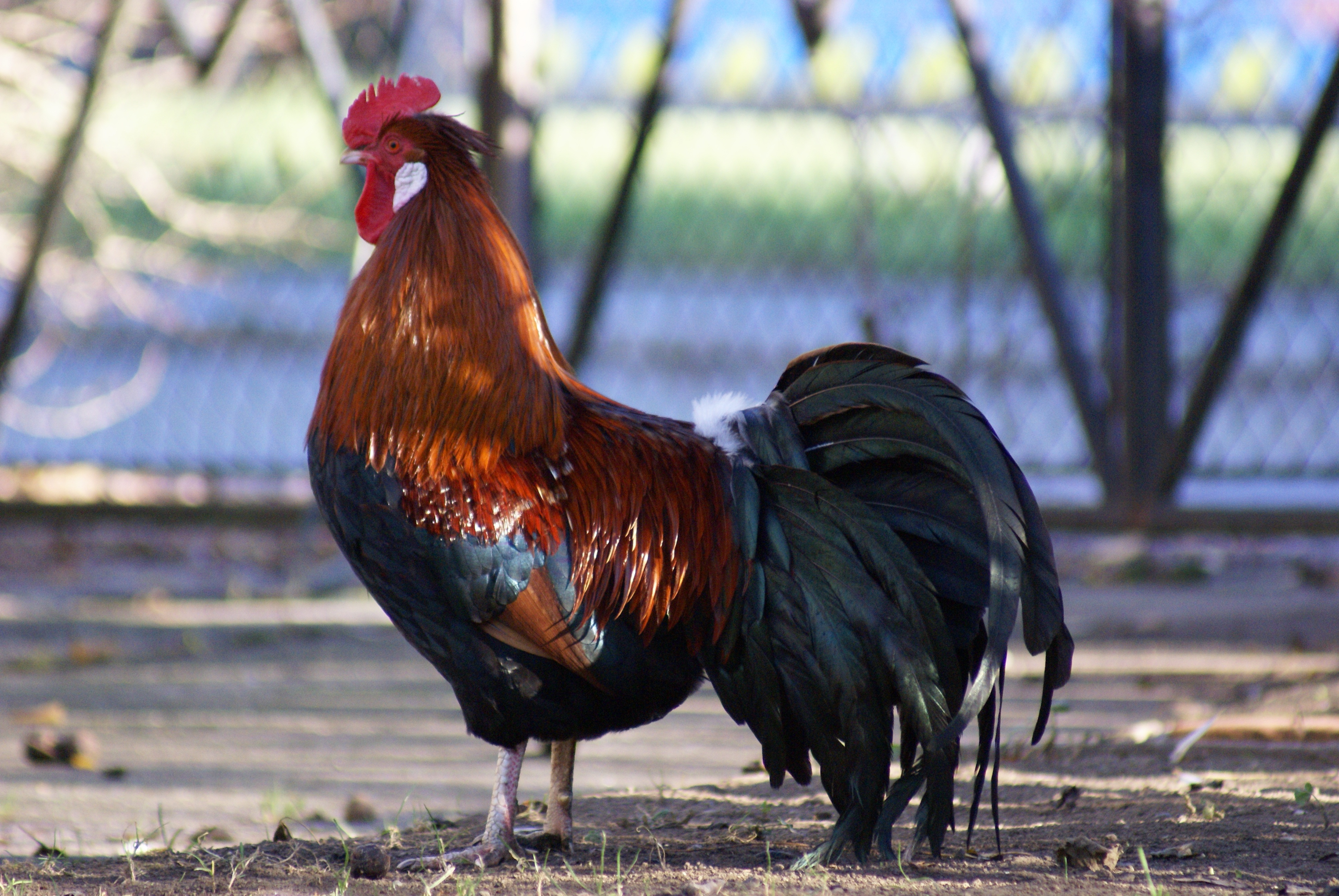
- Rooster of the Styrian Hen
- Conservation status: At risk
- Other names: Styrian Hen; Styrian Chicken; Slovene: Štajerska kokoš; Štajerka; German: Altsteirer Huhn
- Country of origin: Slovenia, Austria
- Standard: Styrian Hen (in Slovene, page 30)
- Use: Dual-purpose breed: mostly eggs, meat

Traits
- Weight: Male: 2.5–3.0 kg; Female: 1.8-2.2 kg
- Skin color: White
- Egg color: Light, ivory
- Comb type: Single

Classification
- EE: yes
- Chicken; Gallus gallus domesticus

Altsteirer, also known as the Styrian Hen and Chicken, Slovene: Štajerska kokoš or Štajerka, German: Altsteirer Huhn, is an autochthonous breed of domestic chicken originating in Slovenia and Austrian state Styria. The Styrian Hen is known as the only autochthonous (native) chicken breed of Slovenian area, with all other breeds being traditional at most, hence introduced in the past and consequently adapted to country's conditions. The Altsteirer's set of traits suggests the breed may share a common descent with other Mediterranean chicken breeds.

== Origin and distribution ==
In the past the hen was probably bred in all alpine regions, ranging from the Danube river to Adriatic sea, as well as the Pannonian Basin. The breed's country of origin is thought to be the area, consisting of the land between rivers Mur and Sava in Slovenian Styria and southern parts of Austrian state Styria. Among the oldest historical records mentioning the Altsteirer Hen is the document about Styrian capons from year 1352. Such birds were often treated as a delicacy in 17th and 18th century.

Germans Armin Arbeiter from Graz and Emanuel Martiny from Celje were among the most important 19th and 20th century advocates of the breed, being responsible for uniting breeders of Altsteirer and starting a systematic breeding. The Styrian Hen was first described in 1894 by the association of breeders in Graz. A breeding center for the Altsteirer was established in 1897 by the Association for Care and Rearing, with its first location being Celje and second Maribor. Arbeiter, who was responsible for breeding in Celje, named the breed the "Celje Hen". The Altsteirer gained importance around 1900, with its breed standard being written two years later (in year 1902) under the supervision of Styrian Agricultural Company. At the same time it was decided to name it the Styrian Hen and earlier names, such as the Celje Hen and the Old Styrian Hen were abandoned.

The breed's numbers declined rapidly after the end of Second World War as agriculture experienced a revolution and the concept of modern poultry husbandry in the form of industry was introduced. Crossbreed chickens of only a few commercial breeds were started to be farmed in great numbers inside big factory-like complexes and the diversity of old, native chicken breeds decreased critically. The Altsteirer was among breeds experiencing the decline as only amateur breeders and rare farmers continued raising it.

In Slovenia a conservation of the breed started after the end of Slovenian War of Independence, when zootechnical experts from the Biotechnical Faculty of University of Ljubljana began collecting the remaining purebred birds still bred by rare farmers and amateur poultry breeders to form an initial flock of birds, that could be used for re-establishing the Altsteirer Hen. Today there are around 1650 birds of the breed (data from 2020), with population's trend being labeled as stable.

== Description ==
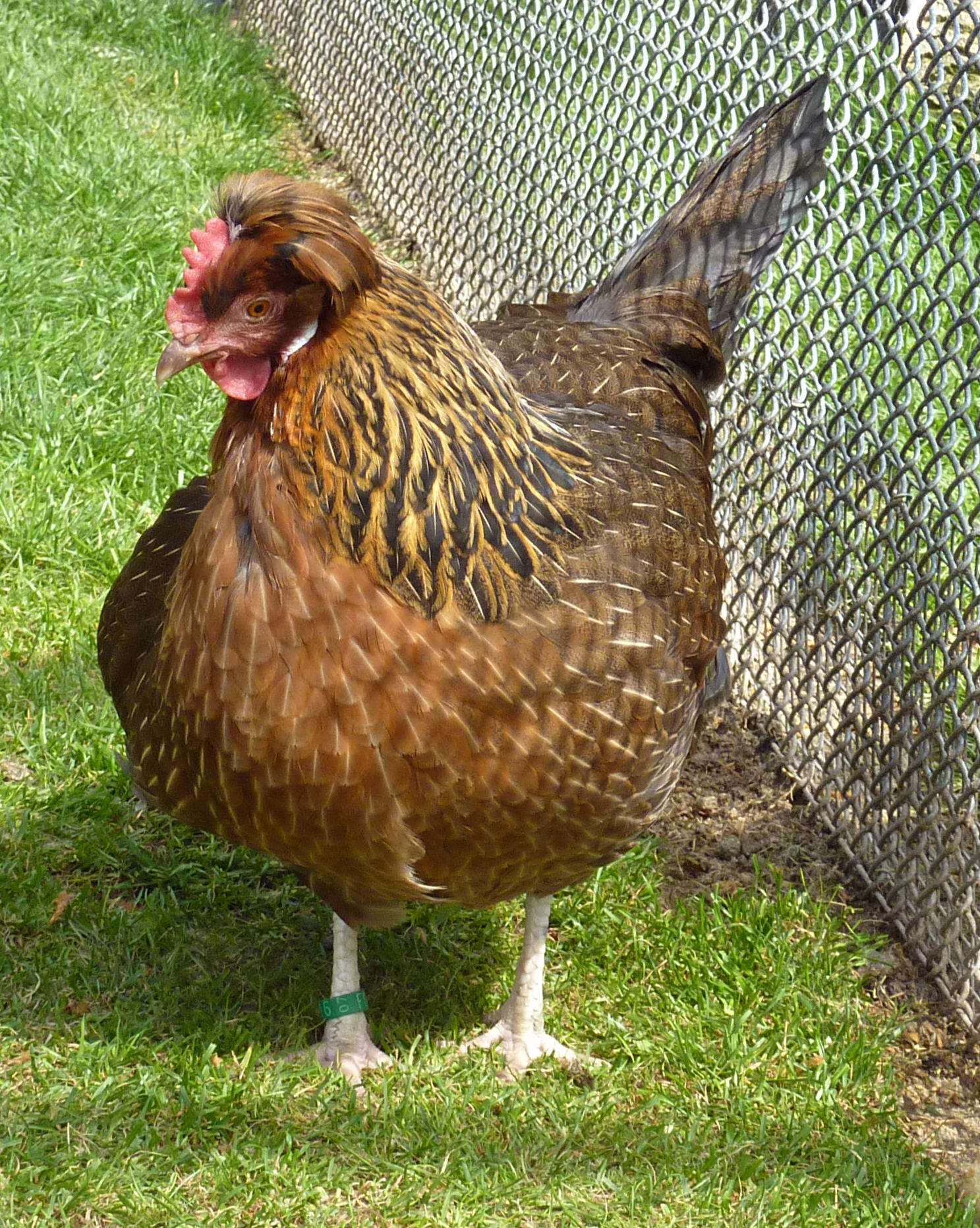
A hen of the Altsteirer

Roosters and capons are heavier than hens and can weigh from 2.5 to 3.0 kilograms. A typical red-eyed and red-faced rooster has a small head, white and small earlobes with white to meat-like short and strong beak. A rooster's medium-sized and accurately toothed comb is simple (single) and set upright, while its wattle is intensively red and can reach short to medium sizes. Males have a less pronounced tassel built of a few long feathers. A rooster's brown-red neck should be medium long and straight. Black-coloured and wide chest is well-rounded and deep. Its dark red back is long and relatively wide, rooster's saddle and shoulders are of dark red colour, while its wings are black with a brown margin. A rooster has a crammed, high and wide tail with shiny black and wide sickle-curved feathers. Animal's medium-sized white legs are thin and naked, with thighs often poorly visible. Its legs can be covered with occasional red spots on the sides and in between toes.

Adult hens reach from 1.8 to 2.2 kilograms. Small-headed females have small earlobes of white colour and a typical rich tassel. A hen's medium-sized comb is simple (single), wrinkled and set upright. Females have a horizontal back and a heavily built frame of the body with a deep chest and a pronounced belly. Medium-sized white legs have brownish scales. A hen's wide tail is set vertical. Partridge-coloured hens have feathers without any shine, their back is brown, chest is of salmon colour, buttocks are gray and their belly is lighter.

=== Colour variants ===
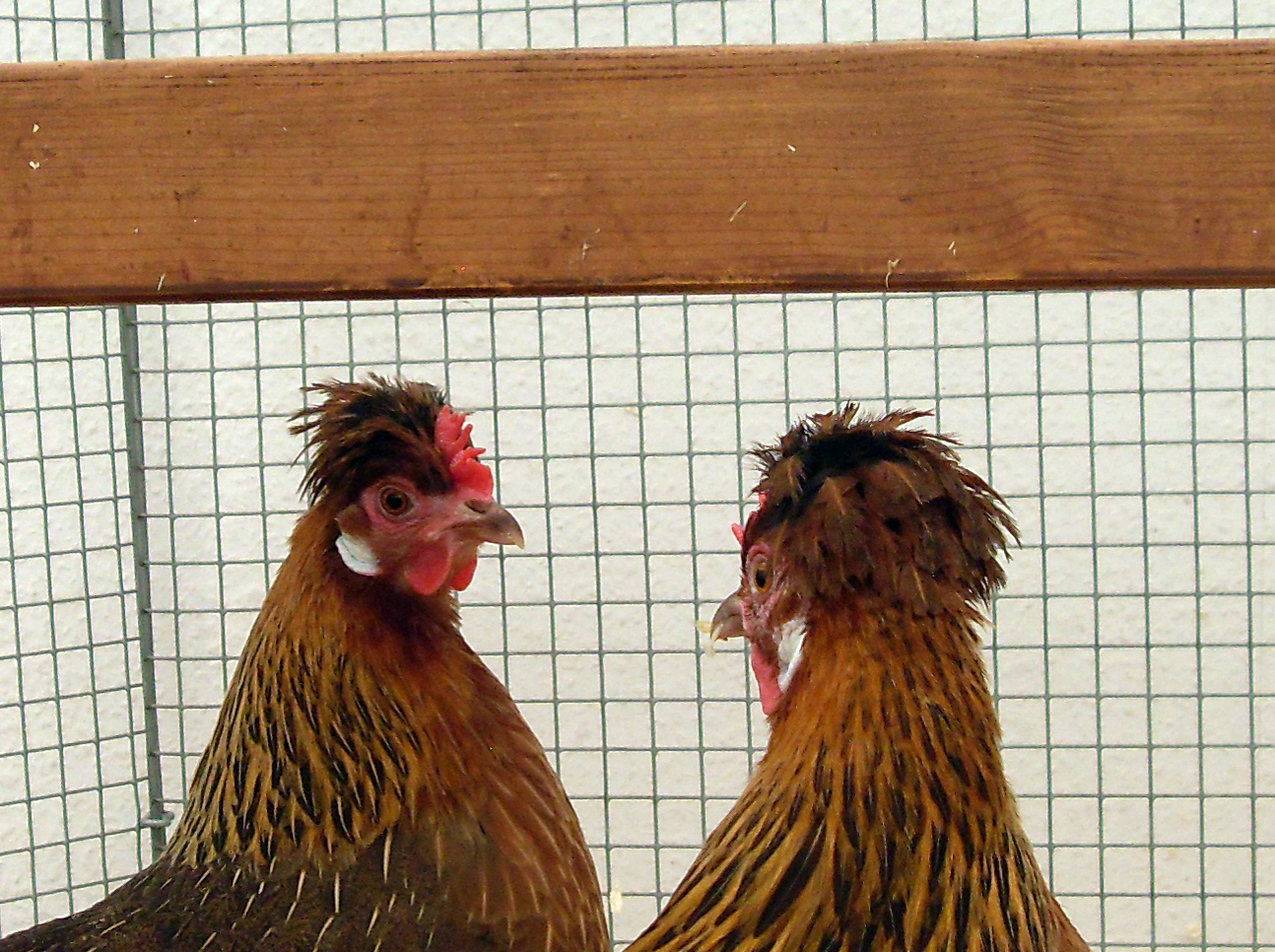
Two Styrian Hens with a characteristic rich tassel (tuft)

Primarily there were three colour variants: red-brown, white and barred. Red-brown, which was the most numerous colour variant in the past, was divided into a partridge-like type with a golden neck (resembling wild red junglefowl), reddish brown birds with somewhat lighter feathers and darker neck and light wheat coloured (yellow) hen raised in the valley of the river Sulm. When the conservation of the breed started after 1991 experts found mostly birds of the partridge-coloured type resulting in a majority of recent animals being of this colour variant.

=== Usage ===
Typical partridge-like Styrian Hen lays only around 130 to 160 eggs per year, and cases with more laid eggs are rare. In comparison to some commercially bred crossbred layer hens the Altsteirer lays a relatively low number of eggs making it unsuitable for commercial farming. It has been shown that Styrian Chickens lay the most eggs when bred traditionally (extensively), on the farm's backyard. Relatively small eggs are light, of ivory colour and usually weigh 55 grams. The Altsteirer is a dual-purpose breed mostly used for obtaining eggs, but also slaughtered for its good quality meat, especially of capons.

== Gallery ==
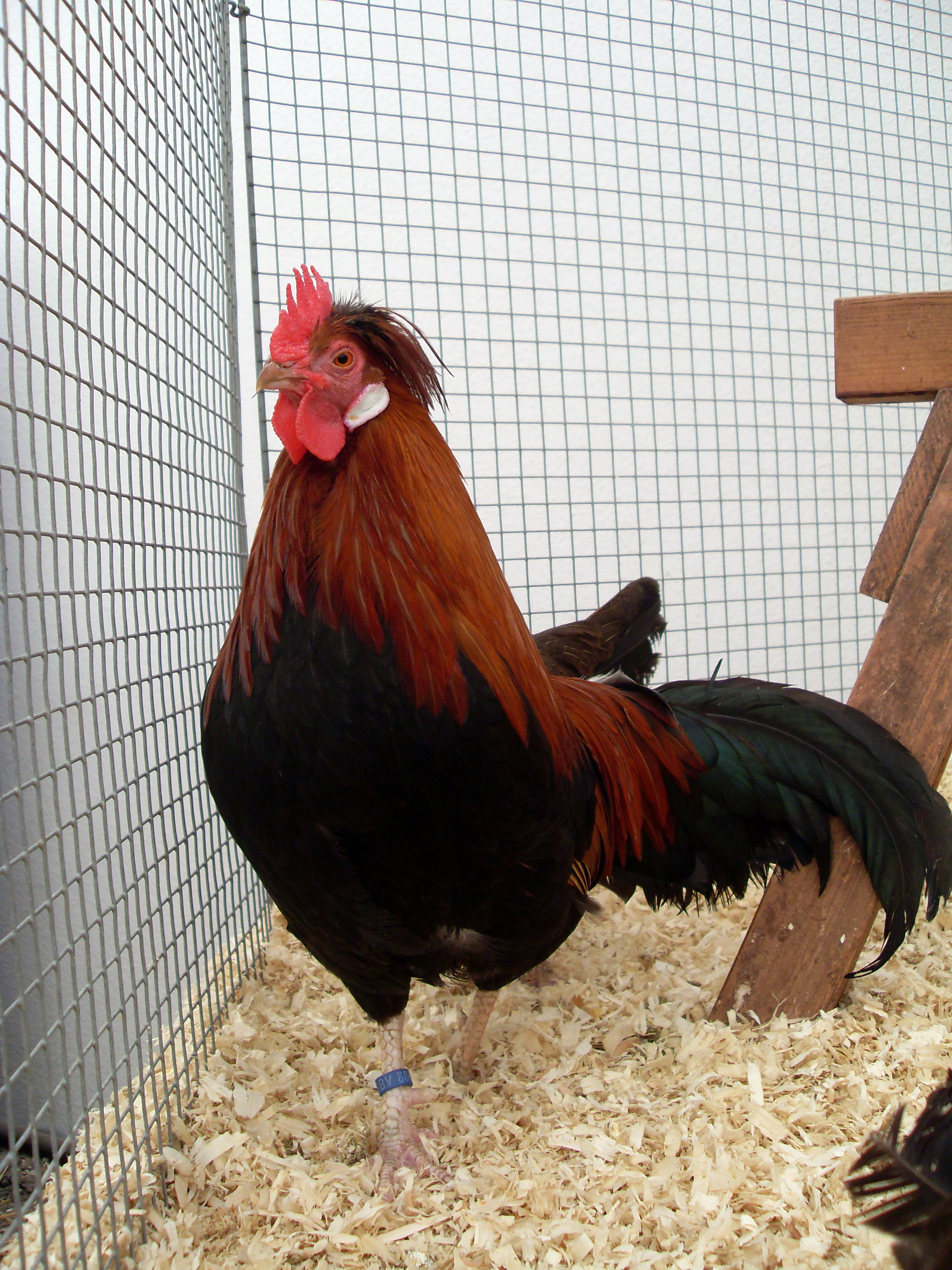

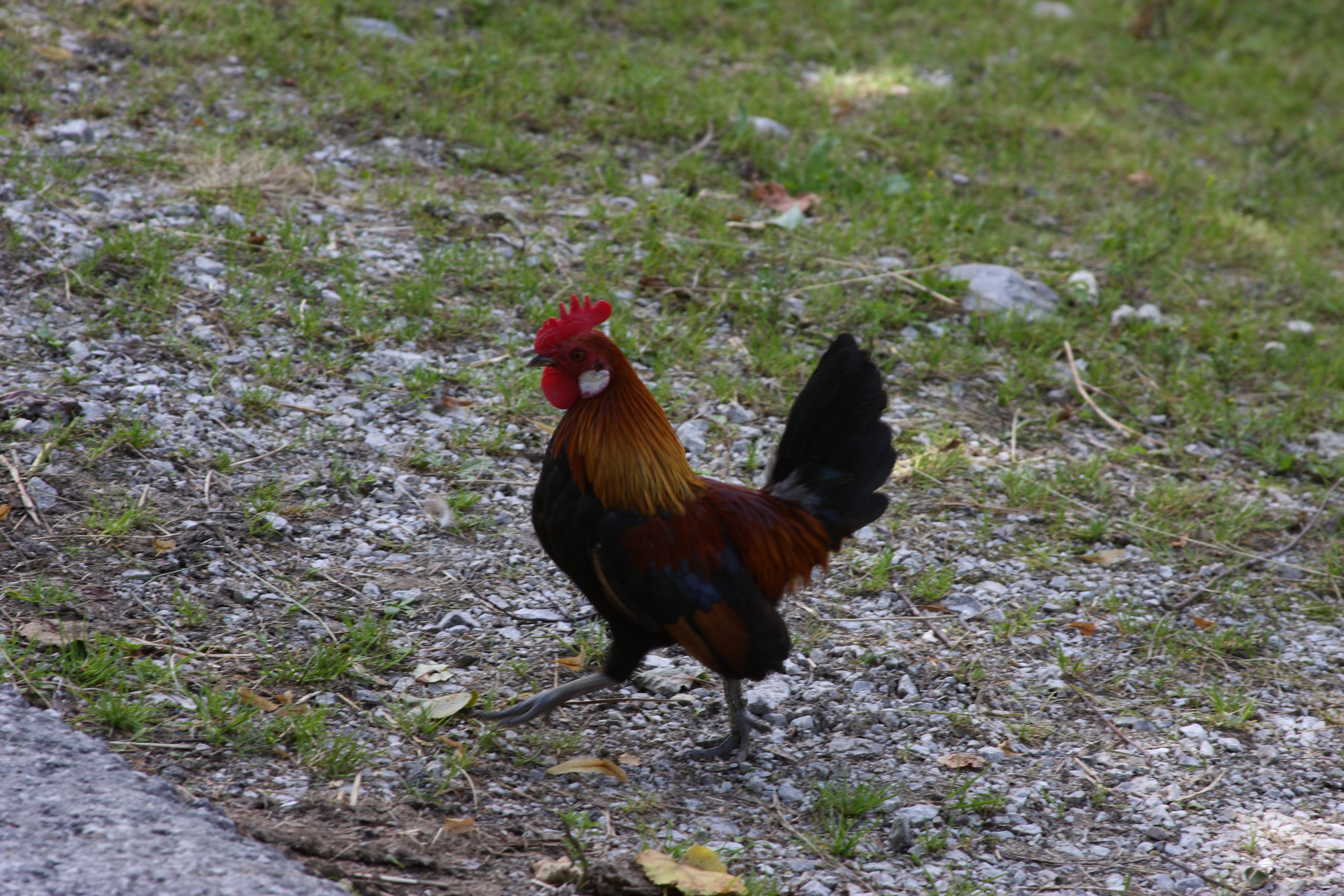

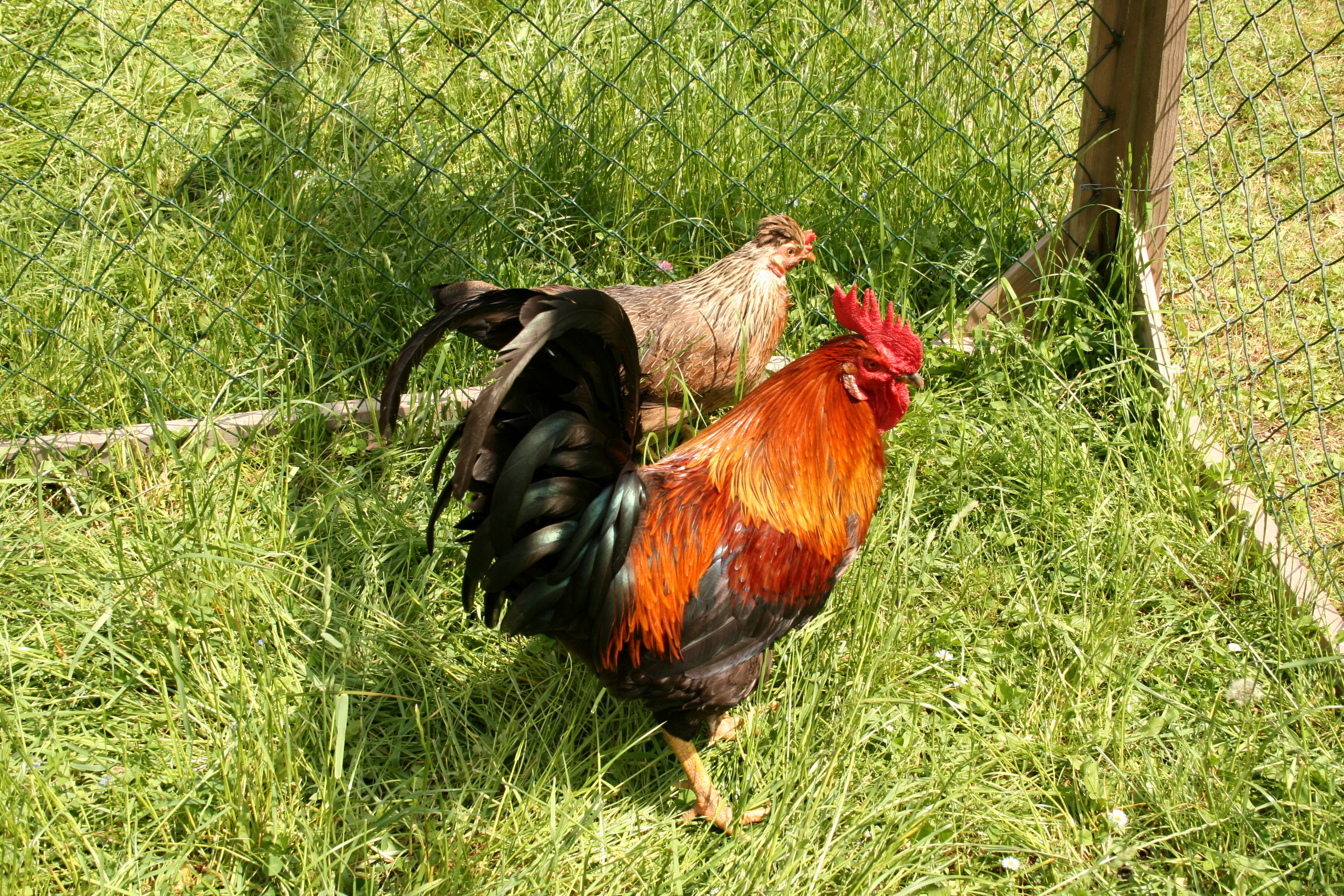

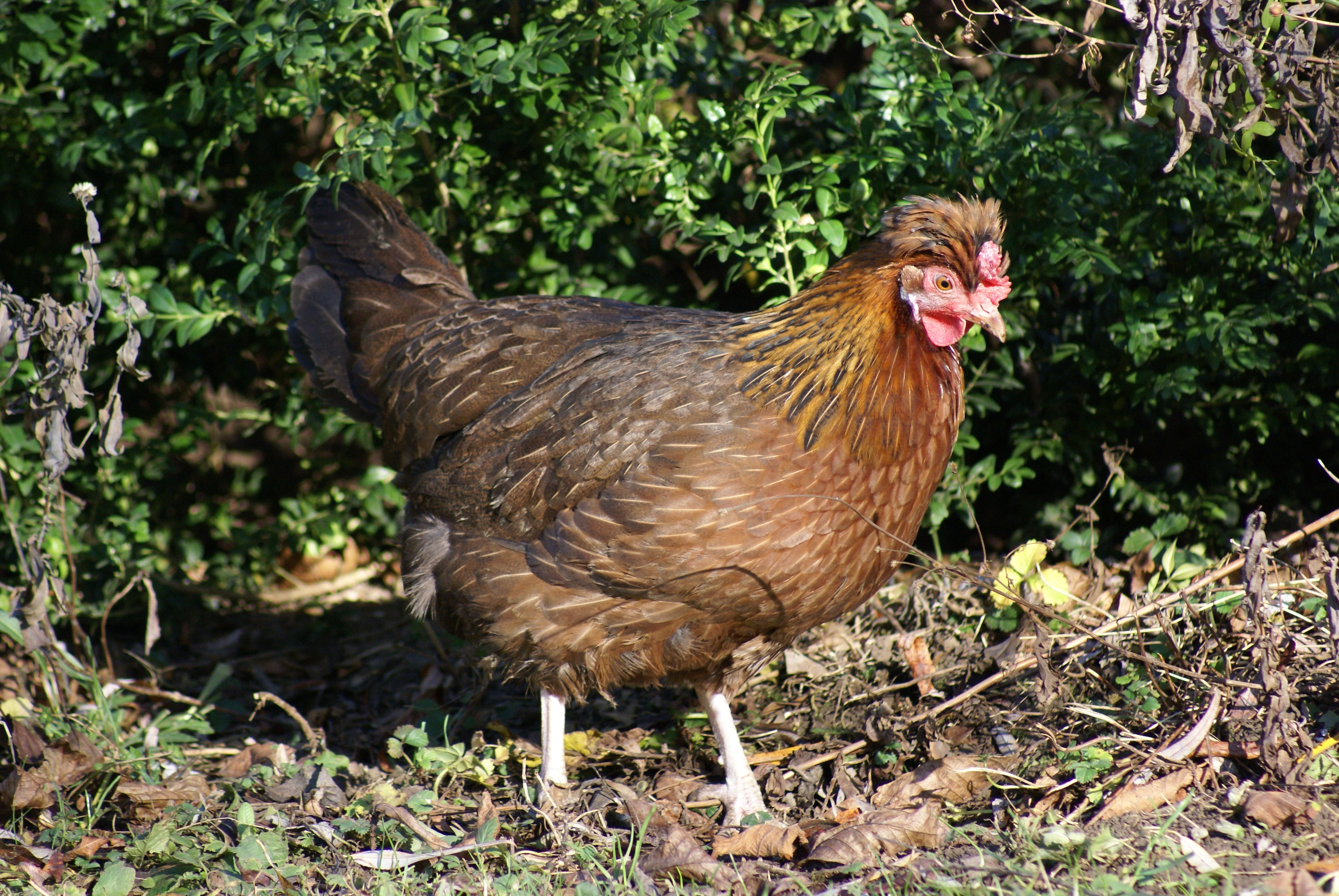

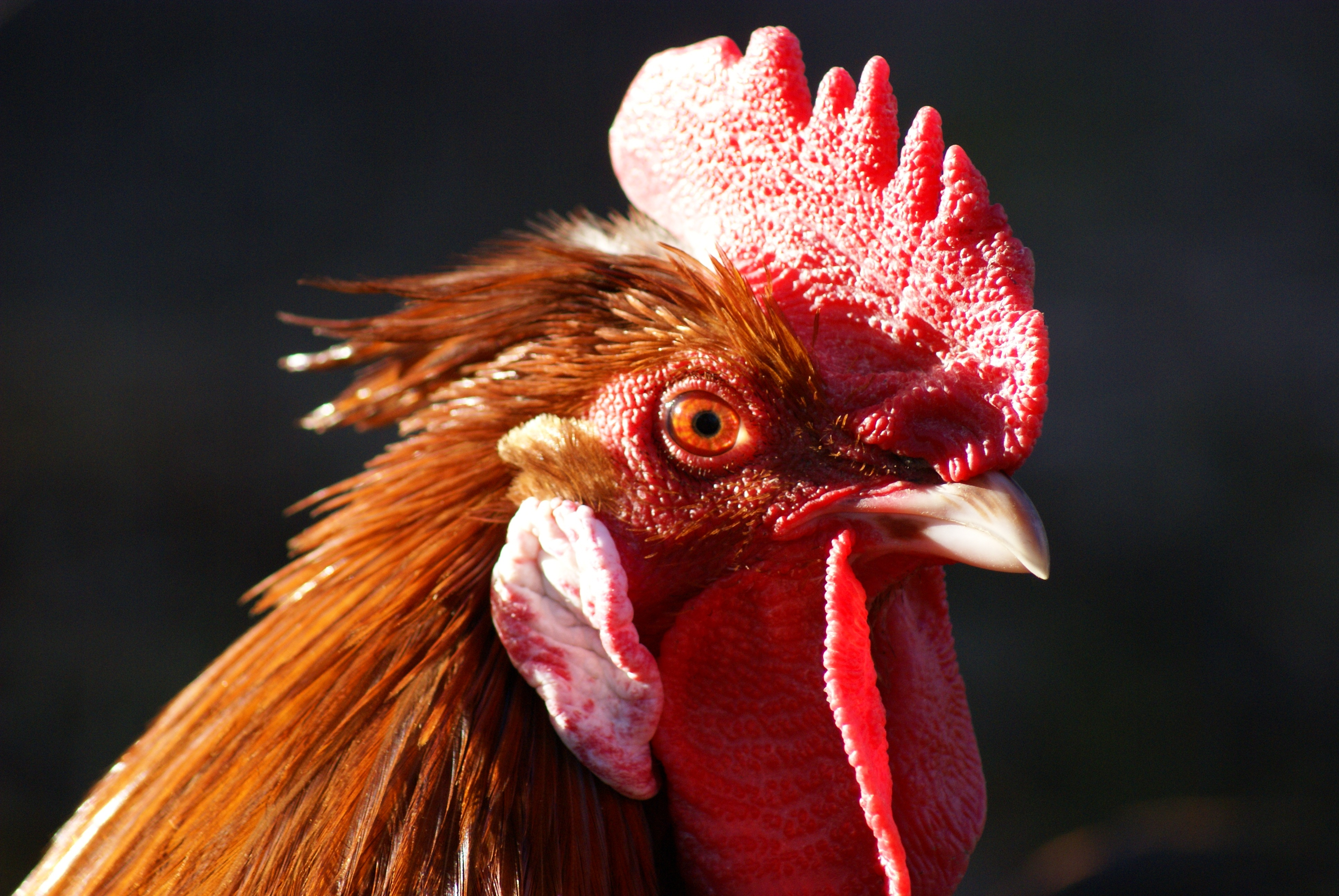

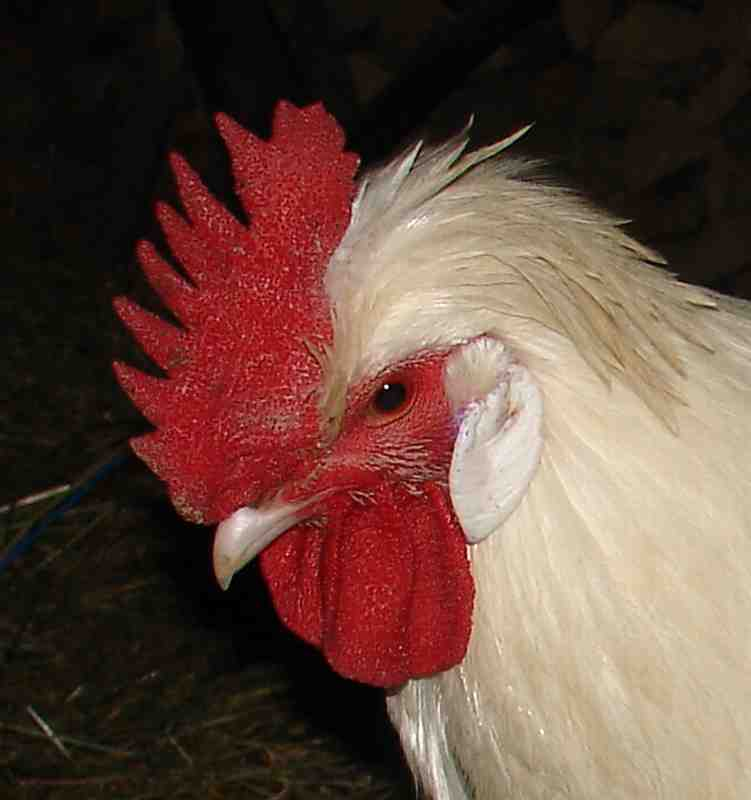

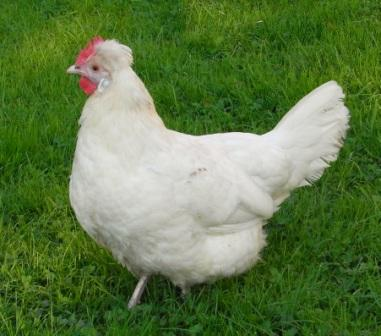

== See also ==
- List of Slovenian domestic animal breeds
- List of chicken breeds
