= Jezersko–Solčava =

Breed of sheep

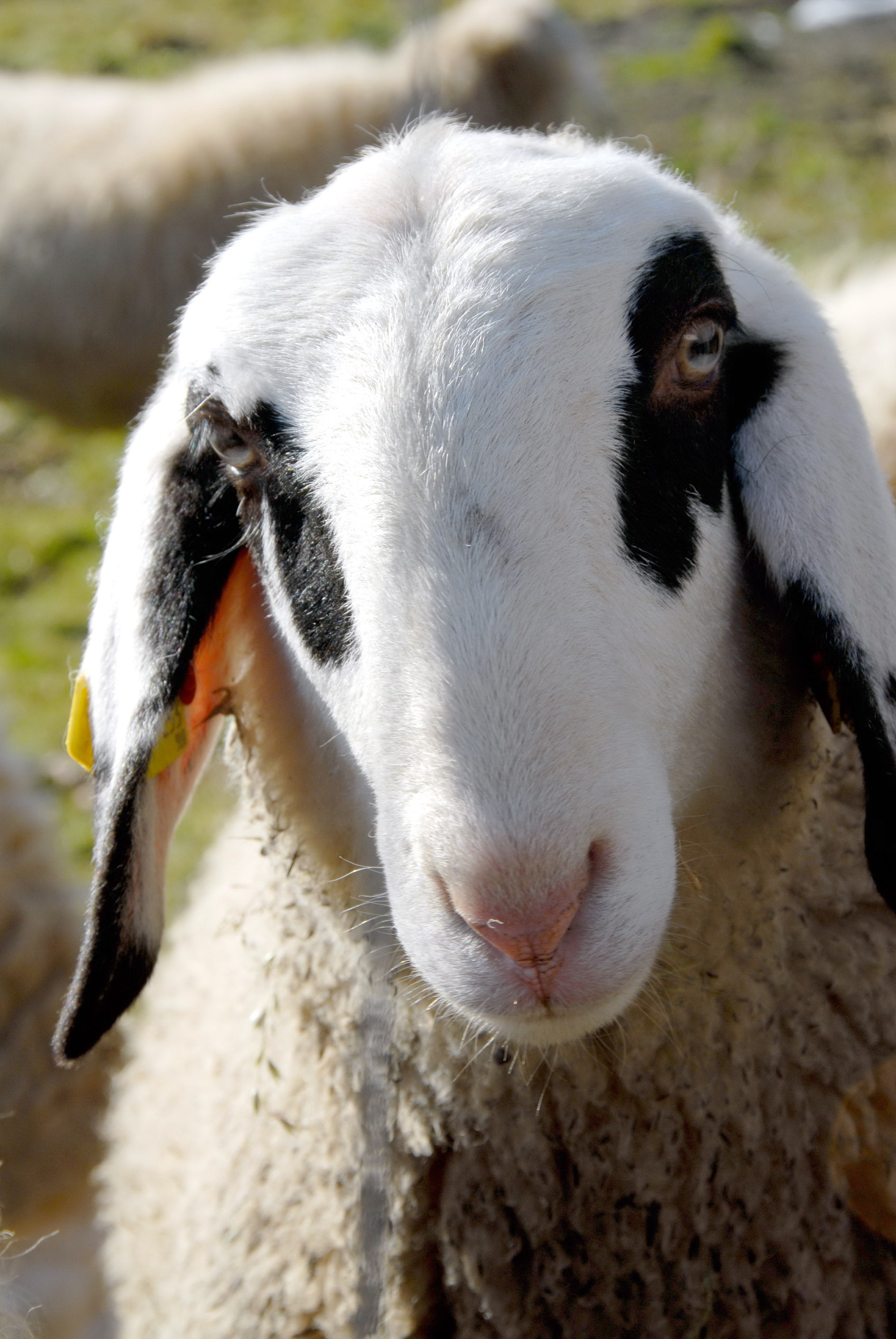
- Other names: Kärntner Brillenschaf; Brillenschaf; Seeländerschaf; Villnösser Schaf; Fiemmese; Tingola; jezerskosolčavska; jezersko-solčavska ovca; jezerka
- Country of origin: Austrian Empire
- Distribution: Austria; Germany; Italy; Serbia; Slovenia
- Use: dual-purpose, meat and wool

Traits
- Weight: Male: 75–80 kg; Female: 55–65 kg
- Height: Male: 81 cm; Female: 75 cm
- Wool color: white
- Face color: white, black patches around the eyes

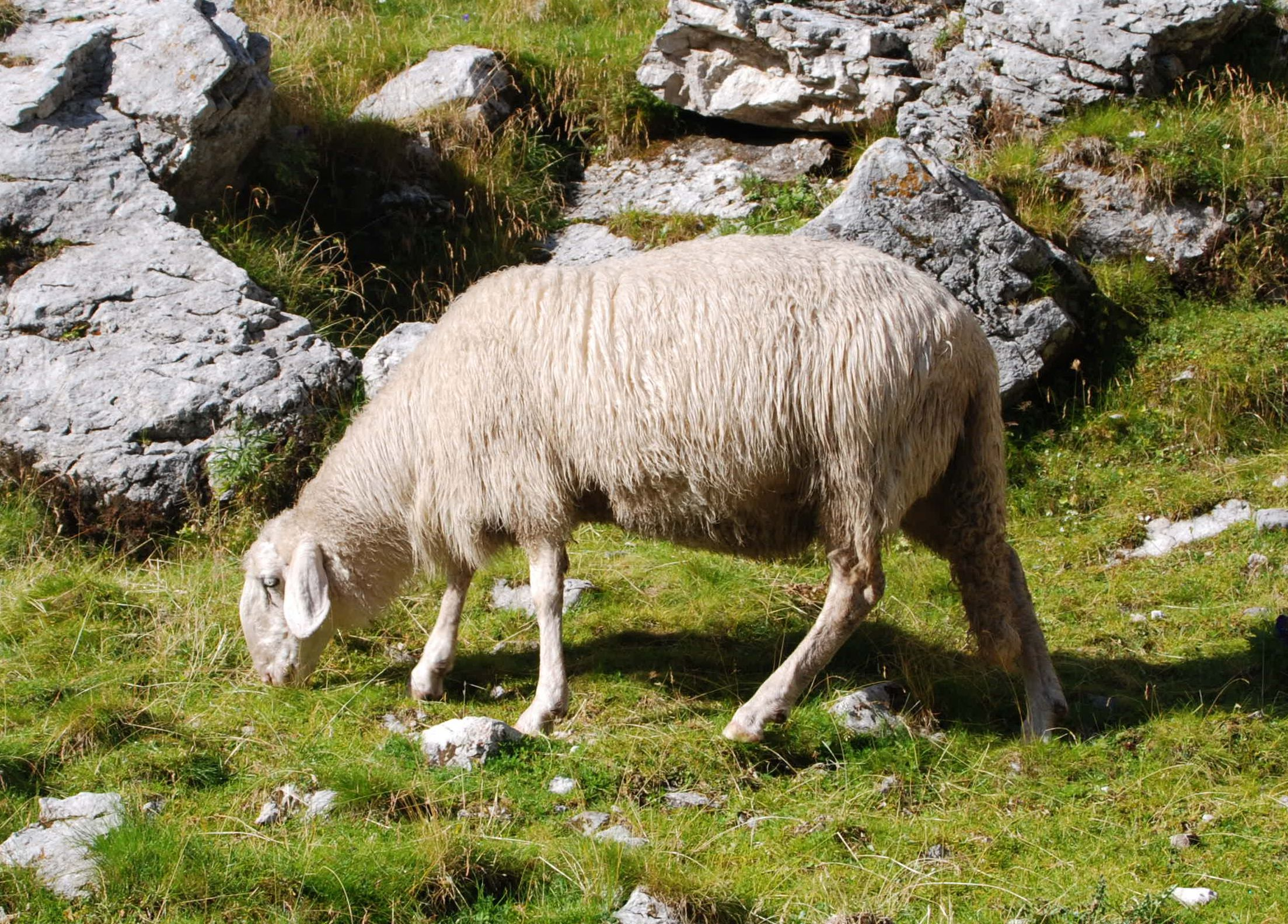
On the Dleskovec Plateau, above the village of Solčava, northern Slovenia

The Jezersko–Solčava is a breed of domestic sheep from the eastern Alpine region of Europe. Until the outbreak of the First World War it was the most numerous sheep breed in southern Carinthia, in Friuli and in Slovenia. Its name derives from the regions of Jezersko and of Solčava, formerly in the Austrian Empire, now in Slovenia. It is raised also in parts of Austria, Germany and Italy; a small number were imported to Serbia in 1991. It may also be known as the German: Kärntner Brillenschaf, Seeländer Schaf or Villnösser Schaf.

== History ==
The traditional mountain sheep reared for hundreds of years in the Alpine region of southern Carinthia were of the primitive Zaupelschaf type, similar to the Tiroler Steinschaf. They were frugal and hardy, and well adapted to the steep slopes and sparse pasture of the mountains, but yielded wool of coarse quality and little meat. During the eighteenth century, when wool production was the most important attribute of sheep, rams of the now-extinct Padovana breed, known for the fine quality of its wool, were brought from the Italian peninsula and cross-bred with the local ewes. The first description of the resulting breed dates from 1844. By 1880, breeding was mainly concentrated in the area round Seeland (now Jezersko, in Slovenia), and it was for this reason known as the Seeländer Rasse. From there, the breed spread widely, throughout Carinthia, through much of Austria-Hungary, and into the Bavarian Alps. The meat was in demand, and many animals were sent to Paris and to Switzerland for slaughter.

In the early twentieth century, demand for wool dropped; attempts were made to improve the meat yield of the Jezersko–Solčava by cross-breeding with the large-framed Bergamasca, a heavy meat breed from northern Italy. This had the undesirable result of lowering the quality of the wool. Under the Rassebereinigung ("breed cleansing") policies of the National Socialist régime, the Jezersko–Solčava was virtually exterminated by substitution cross-breeding with the Deutsches Bergschaf. After the Second World War the population continued to decline, reaching a low point in the 1980s, when only about 200 head remained in Austria.

At the end of 2013 the population reported from Slovenia was 17200; Austria reported 5112–6500, Germany 727 and Italy 4973.

== Characteristics ==
The Jezersko–Solčava sheep has black patches around the eyes, which may give it the appearance of wearing glasses. It has a markedly convex profile and is lop-eared; the lower part – from one to two thirds – of the ears is black. The lips and chin may be flecked with black; the coat is otherwise white. Both sexes are polled (hornless). The hooves are strong.

== Use ==
The Jezersko–Solčava is a dual-purpose breed, reared both for meat and for its wool, of which it yields 4–5 kg per year. The wool is fine and of good quality.

Ewes lamb twice a year, with a twinning rate of 70%.
