= Istrian milk =

Breed of sheep

Istrian Milk
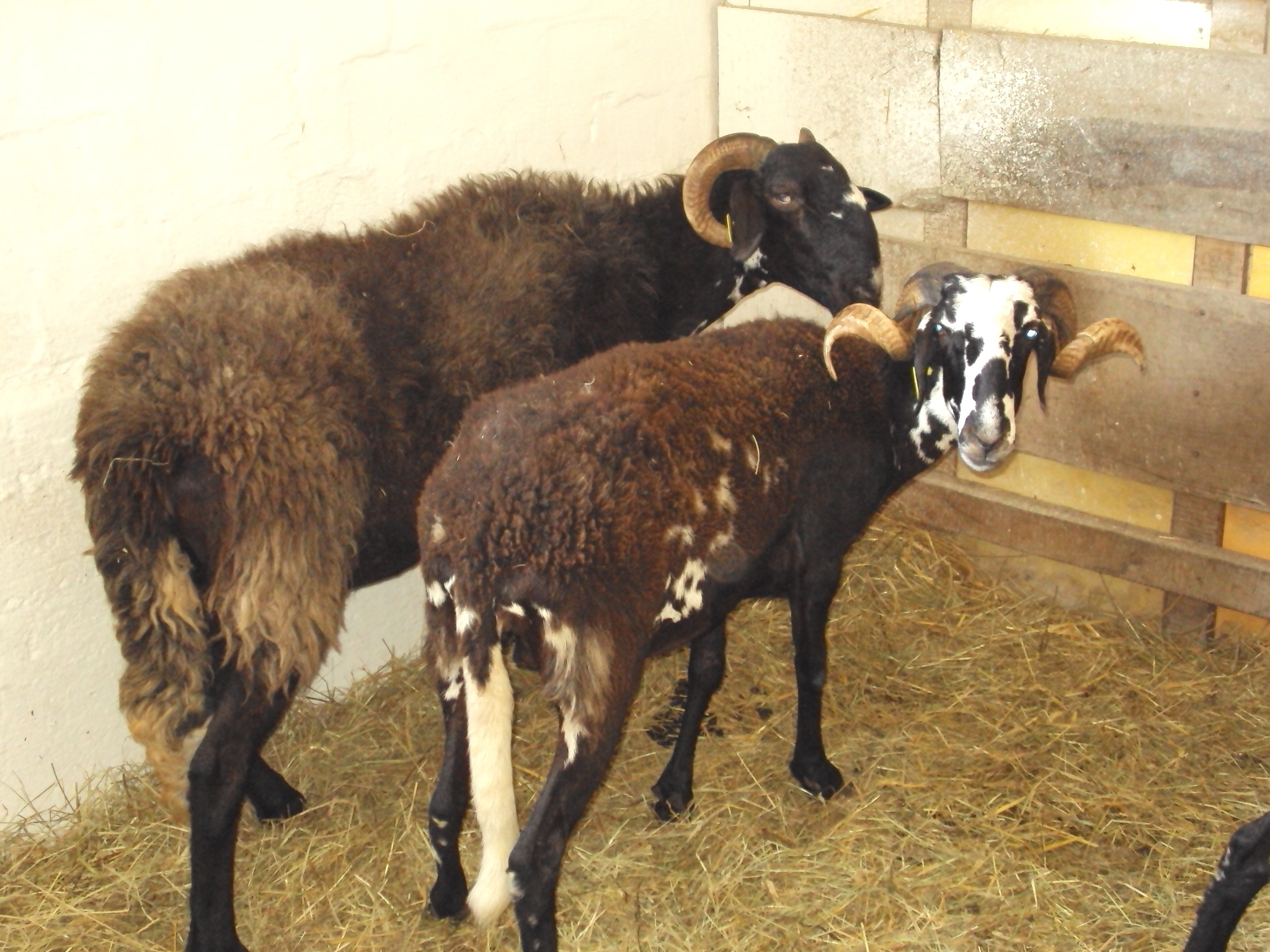
- Two dark colored Istrian Milk Sheep
- Conservation status: Endangered
- Other names: Istrian Pramenka, Istarska Ovca, Istarka Prmaneka, Istarka Mljenca, Istriana, Carsolina
- Country of origin: Croatia, Slovenia, Italy
- Distribution: Croatia, Slovenia and Italy
- Type: Pramenka
- Use: Primarily dairy, also wool and meat

Traits
- Weight: Male: 95 kg; Female: 60–75 kg
- Horn status: Rams horned, ewes polled

The Istrian Milk is a breed of domestic sheep native to the Karst Plateau and the Istria region in Slovenia, Croatia and Italy. The Istrian Milk is mainly used for its milk, which is primarily used in cheese making. Today, the breed is endangered.

== History ==
The Istrian Milk sheep is native to the Istrian peninsula of Croatia and the Karst region of Croatia, Slovenia, and Italy. The breed likely developed out of indigenous sheep being crossed with Apulian and Syrian breeds during Roman times, and balkan breeds in the 17th century. The Istrian Milk was traditionally raised by transhumance, with migratory herds grazing in Snežnik in the summer, Vremščica in the fall and Istria and Friuli through the winter months.

However, recent political division has prohibited transhumance grazing in the Istrian Milk's traditional range. This has caused the breed to be divided into three reproductively isolated groups: one in Croatia, one in Slovenia, and one in Italy. Today, they are primarily raised in permanent or semi-permanent herds. Although there are some variations in their characteristics, there is little genetic difference in these populations today.

== Characteristics ==
The Istrian Milk has a large frame and long, powerful legs. Rams typically weigh about 95 kg and have large, spiral shaped horns, while ewes weigh around 60–75 kg and are usually polled. Typically, they are white-ish in color with dark brown or black spots, although there are some primarily dark animals as well. Ewes are able to breed at two years of age, while rams can breed at one year. The Istrian Milks' average litter size is about 1.21 lambs.

The Istrian Milk sheep's milk is known for being very high in fat content and protein. Their milk averages a fat content of 9% and a 6.4% protein content, although some individual sheep can produce milk with 13% fat and 7% protein. Typically, Istrian Milk sheep produce 100–150 kg of milk per lactation, although studies have found that Croatian Istrian Milk sheep produce substantially more, averaging 205 kg of milk per lactation. There have been attempts to cross the Istrian Milk with the East Friesian in order to increase its milk production.

== Uses ==
As its name indicates, the Istrian Milk is primarily a dairy breed; however, it is kept for meat and wool as well. Its milk is primarily used for cheese making. Their milk is well-suited for cheese because of the breed's adaptations to its natural habitat, especially plants available for grazing. Their milk is traditionally used in Istrian cheese, a traditional aged sheep cheese originating in the Istrian peninsula. However, many other cheeses are produced from its milk, as well.

The Istrian Milk is also sometimes raised exclusively for lamb meat. Lambs are typically slaughtered at 5–6 weeks of age and 12–25 kg of weight. They have an average dressing percentage of 45.9%. Due to small population size and issues with predatory animals, Istrian Milk lambs are normally not found for sale in Slovenia.

== Conservation status ==
Today, the Istrian Milk sheep is endangered. The estimated remaining population includes roughly 2,743 in Croatia, roughly 1,020 in Slovenia, and around 1,000 in Italy. In Italy, the breed was especially threatened by a general collapse of sheep raising in the Karst upland after World War II, which saw the number of Istrian Milk in Italy plummet to about 250 in 1983, down from around 1,000 in the early 1960s. Today, however, there are conservation programs in place in all three countries with Istrian Milk populations.
