= Bovec sheep =

Breed of sheep

Bovec
- Other names: Bovška Ovca; Plezzana; Trentarka; Krainer Steinschaf
- Country of origin: Slovenia
- Distribution: Austria; Italy; Slovenia
- Use: Meat, milk

Traits
- Weight: Male: 45 kg (99 lb); Female: 45 kg (99 lb)
- Wool color: Off-white, brown or black
- Face color: White, sometimes spotted

The Bovec (Slovene: bovška ovca, Italian: Plezzana, German: Krainer Steinschaf) is a breed of domestic sheep from the upper valley of the Soča or Isonzo river, now in Slovenia. The breed is named in both Slovenian and in Italian for the town of Bovec or Plezzo; in the Trenta valley it may also be called Trentarka. It is raised in the Soča valley in Slovenia, in the areas of Resia and Tarvisio in Friuli in Italy, and in Styria and Carinthia in Austria. The breed is raised for milk and for meat.

== Characteristics ==
The Bovec may be off-white, or in about 30% of cases, black or brown. They have small ears, short, thin legs, and their belly is bare. The back legs are inclined forward so that they can walk on steep meadows easily.

Height of rams is 64 cm (25 in) and ewes 60 cm (24 in) at the withers. A breeding ewe provides approximately 1.23 lambs per litter, lactates for 210 days and in that time yields 221 kg (487 lb) of milk with 6.3% fat.

== Numbers ==
In 2012 a population in Slovenia of 3500 was reported to DAD-IS. Other sources estimate the number of pure-bred examples there at 1200. The Krainer Steinschaf population in Austria was reported to be in the range 2719–4000 in 2012.

The Plezzana is one of the forty-two autochthonous local sheep breeds of limited distribution for which a herdbook is kept by the Associazione Nazionale della Pastorizia, the Italian national association of sheep-breeders; in 2013 the herdbook was empty. The population in Italy is estimated at 40–50 head.
