= Deutsches Bergschaf =

Breed of sheep

The Deutsches Bergschaf (Weißes Bergschaf, White Mountain, Deutsches Weisses Bergschaf) is a breed of domestic sheep native to Germany. The breed was developed by breeding local sheep with Bergamasca and Tyrol Mountain breeds.

== Characteristics ==
It is a dual-purpose (meat, wool) breed, with coarse to medium wool and is polled (hornless).
