= Karst Shepherd =

Slovenian dog breed

Karst Shepherd Dog
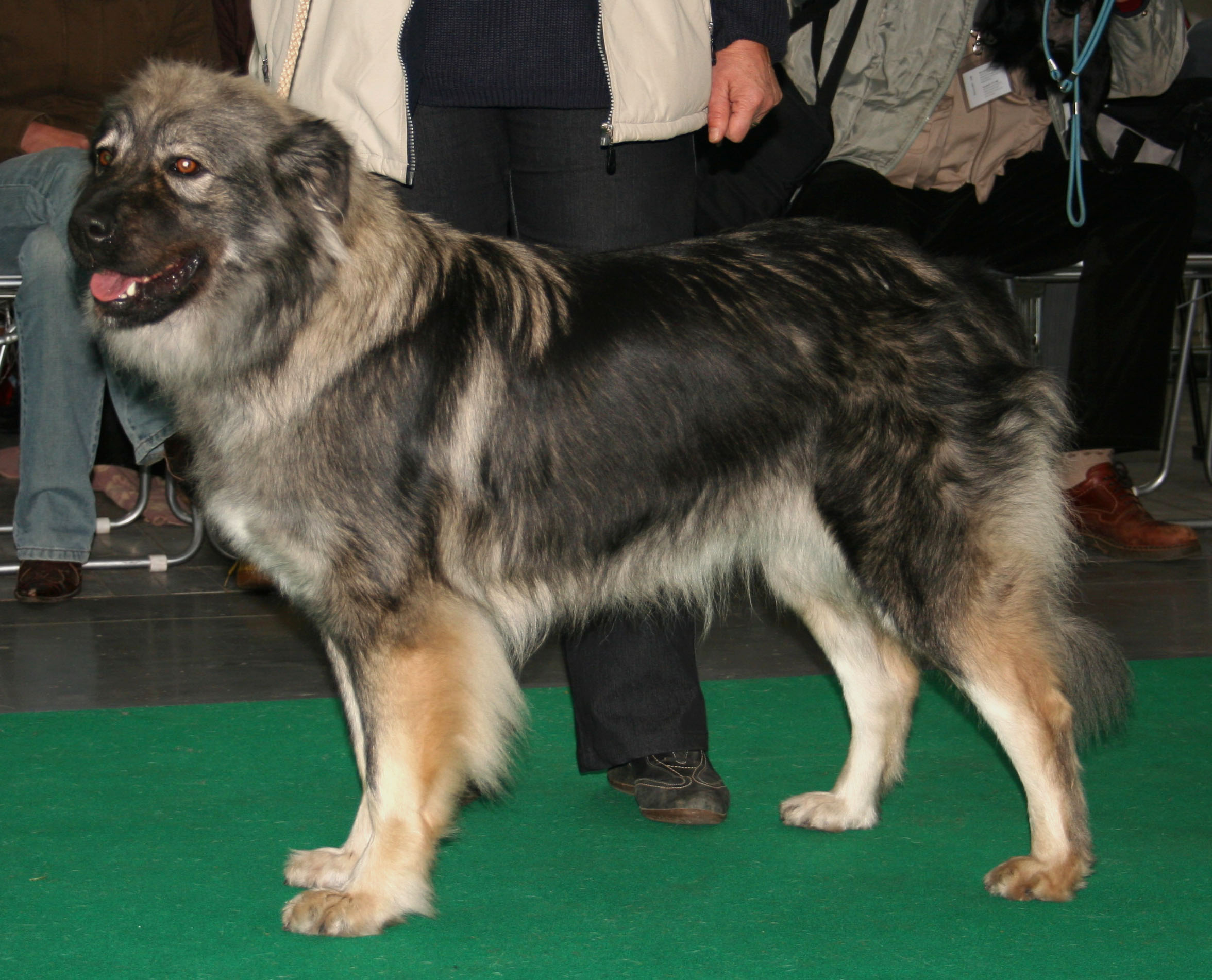
- Other names: Slovene: kraški ovčar
- Common nicknames: Slovene: kraševec
- Origin: Slovenia
Kennel club standards
- Fédération Cynologique Internationale: standard

The Karst Shepherd Dog (Slovene: kraški ovčar or kraševec) is a breed of dog of the livestock guardian type, originating in Slovenia. This breed is recognised by the Fédération Cynologique Internationale.

== Appearance ==
The Karst Shepherd Dog is a medium-sized dog with a long 'iron grey' coat.

The Karst Shepherd Dog's skull is slightly longer than its muzzle; the breed standard calls for a length of 13–14 cm (5.1–5.5 in) for the skull and a length of 11–12 cm (4.3–4.7 in) for the muzzle. The nose, eyelids, and lips are black in colour. The eyes are 'almond shaped' being either chestnut or dark brown in colour. The ears are not erect but instead lie flat. The ears are of medium size. The long and thick coat give the appearance of a mane around the neck. The tail is positioned normally but has a slight hook to the tip. Dogs are 57–63 cm (22–25 in) tall at the withers and bitches are 54–60 cm (21–24 in). Dogs range from 30–42 kg (66–93 lb) in weight and bitches are 25–37 kg (55–82 lb).

== Temperament ==
The breed standard describes the dog as having a sharp temperament and strong individuality, distrustful of strangers. It is a good guard dog. Like all large dogs, the Karst Shepherd needs to be well socialized while very young, with people if the dog is to be a companion, and with livestock if the dog is to be a guardian. If the breed's background is taken into consideration, and if the dog is well socialized and trained, he may make a good family dog. Temperament of individual dogs may vary.

== History ==
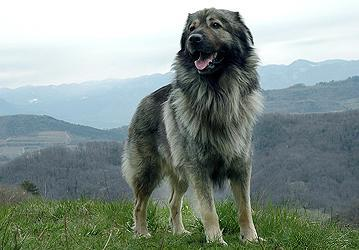
Photo of a Karst Shepherd Dog

The Karst Shepherd is named after the Karst Plateau in Slovenia and more generally after the Karst landscape that extends to Croatia and partly in Bosnia and Herzegovina, from the Gulf of Trieste to the Dinaric Alps. Mostly bred in Slovenia and Istria in Croatia. The ancestral type of the modern day breed travelled with shepherds through this area, and most likely came with ancient nomadic pastoralists. In 1689, the ethnographer Johann Weikhard von Valvasor mentioned the shepherd's dogs of the area in his work The Glory of the Duchy of Carniola and described them as strong and fearless dogs from Pivka area. In the 20th century, when the landrace shepherd dogs began to be documented as a modern breed, it was first referred to as the Illyrian Shepherd (1939).

The Fédération Cynologique Internationale recognises the breed in Group 2, Section 2.2 Molossoid breeds-Mountain type, number 278. The breed has also been exported to the United States, where it is recognised by The United Kennel Club in the Guardian Dog Group. The breed is also recognised by various minor kennel clubs and internet-based dog registry businesses, and is promoted as a rare breed for those seeking a unique pet.

== See also ==
- List of dog breeds
- Šarplaninac
