= Fleckvieh =

Breed of cattle

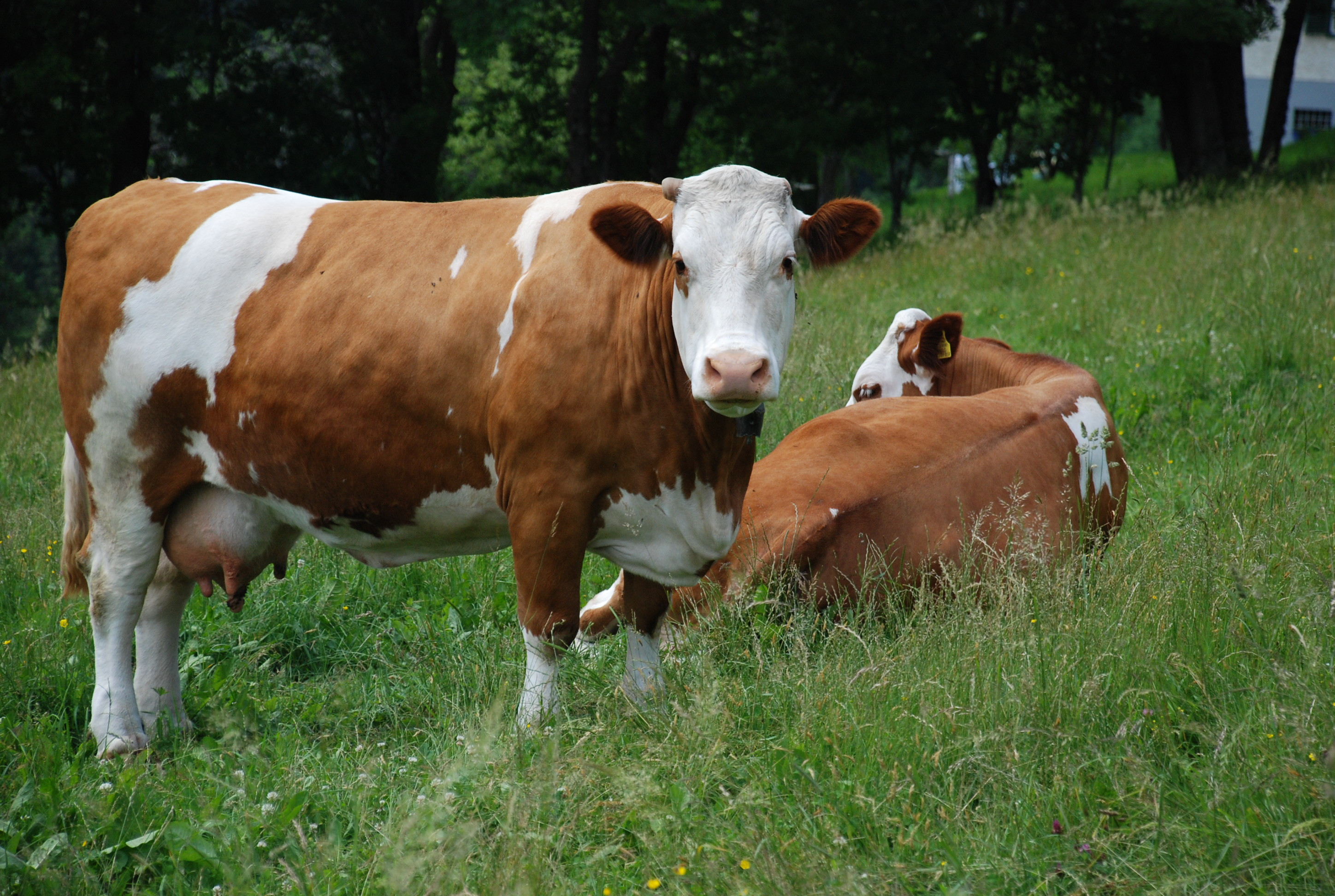
- Fleckvieh cows at Rettenbach, in Deutschlandsberg, Styria, Austria
- Conservation status: not at risk
- Country of origin: Austria; Germany
- Distribution: worldwide
- Use: dual-purpose, meat and milk; formerly triple-purpose: meat, milk, draught; cross-breeding

Traits
- Weight: Male: 1100–1300 kg; Female: 700–800 kg
- Height: Male: 150–165 cm; Female: 140–150 cm
- Coat: red pied or solid red
- Horn status: horned or polled
- Cattle; Bos (primigenius) taurus

Fleckvieh cow near Oeschinen Lake, Switzerland

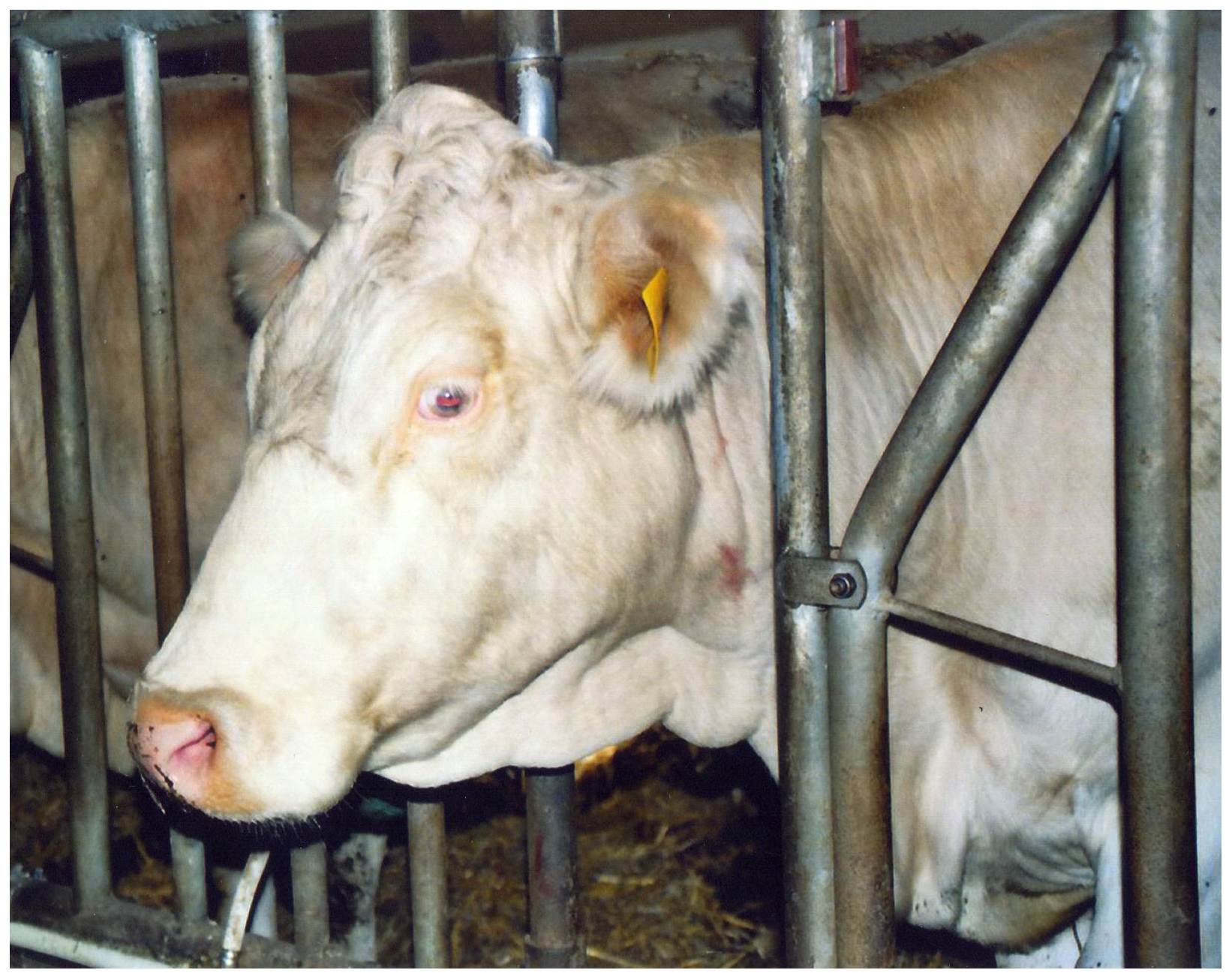
German White Fleckvieh cow

The Fleckvieh (German pronunciation: [ˈflɛkfiː], lit. 'spotted cattle') is a breed of dual-purpose cattle suitable for both milk and meat production. It originated in Central Europe in the 19th century from cross-breeding of local stock with Simmental cattle imported from Switzerland. Today, the worldwide population is 41 million animals.

== History ==
The Fleckvieh originated in the Austrian Empire and the Kingdom of Bavaria from cross-breeding of local stock with Simmental cattle imported from Switzerland from about 1830. The Simmental had good milk-producing and draught qualities, and the resulting crosses were triple-purpose animals with milk, meat, and draught capabilities. The Fleckvieh is now a dual-purpose breed; it may be used for the production of beef or milk, or be crossed with dairy breeds or with beef breeds.

It is reported from several European countries, including Austria, Belgium, Germany, the Netherlands, and Spain, and also, since 2009, from Switzerland; in Hungary, the Fleckvieh is present on many small farms and its importance is growing steadily. It is also reported from other countries of the world, including Australia, Paraguay, Peru, and Uruguay.

== Meat production ==
A comparison was made between the rates of muscle growth and energy use of Fleckvieh bulls as compared to German Black Pied (Schwarzbunte) bulls. The Fleckvieh bulls had faster growth rates, the carcasses had a smaller proportion of fat, especially abdominal fat, and the animals could be slaughtered at an earlier date on similar diets.
