= Slovenian Cold-blood =

Slovenian horse breed

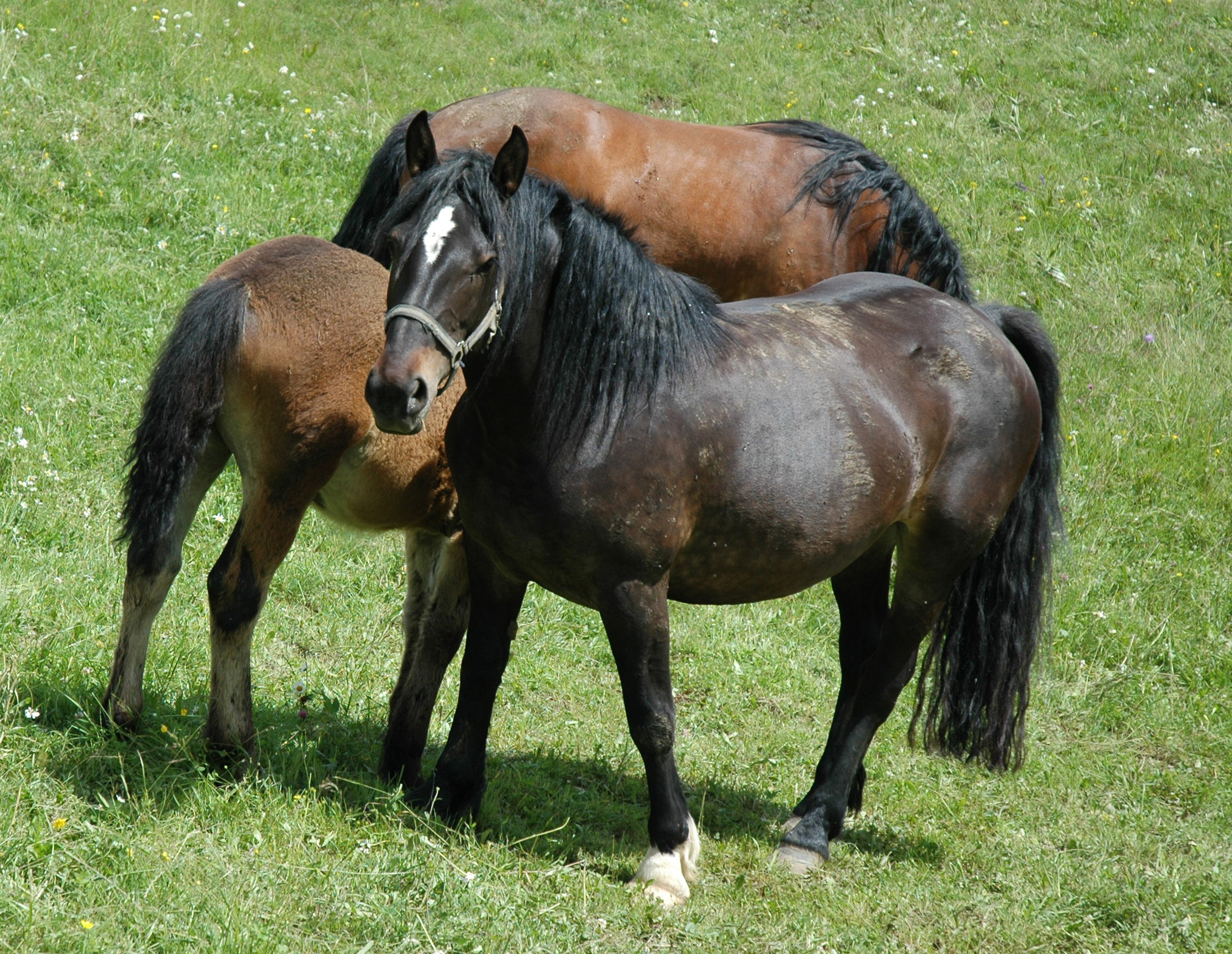
- Three Slovenian Cold-bloods, Babno Polje
- Other names: Slovenian Cold-blooded Horse; Slovene: Slovenski hladnokrvni konj
- Country of origin: Slovenia
- Standard: Breed standard for Slovenian Cold-blood (in Slovene)
- Use: primarily used for meat and milk production, as well as working horse

Traits
- Height: Male: 148–160 cm; Female: 146–158 cm
- Colour: mostly bay or black
- Distinguishing features: medium sized cold-blood

Slovenian Cold-blood (Slovene: Slovenski hladnokrvni konj) is an autochthonous breed of horse, originating in Slovenia. There are only four autochthonous horse breeds in Slovenia, besides Slovenian Cold-blood the Bosnian Mountain Horse, Lipizzan and Posavac also have this status. The breed got its current name in year 1964. Slovenian cold-blood horses are mostly bay or black, can have white facial markings and reach medium sizes.

== Origin and distribution ==
The breed originates from northeastern Slovenia and Upper Carniola on the basis of local cold-blooded horses. In historical records it is evident that developing the Slovenian Cold-blood included breeding of multiple other coldbloods (such as Bohinj, Kobarid, Međimurje, Posavje, Alpine horse and others), of which some already went extinct.

The breed, consisting of the original population of autochthonous cold-bloods, was improved during the rule of Austro-Hungarian Empire by pairing mares of Slovenian Cold-blood with Belgian and Noric stallions, as well as using both Noric and Percheron stallions between world wars of 20th century. Until around year 1980 Slovenian breeders also bred stallions of Croatian Cold-blood for a short period of time. A breed with the most significant impact on the development of the Slovenian Cold-blood is the Austrian breed, Noriker. The current Slovenian Cold-blood population is being divided into multiple bloodlines, with all except one (of Croatian-Belgian Međimurje origin) being connected with Noric ancestors.

Nowadays the breed is thought to be widely distributed in all regions of Slovenia, with Slovenian Cold-blood's population consisting of around 3050 individuals (based on the data from year 2020) and population's trend being labeled as stable. The breed is the most numerous Slovenian horse breed.

== Appearance ==
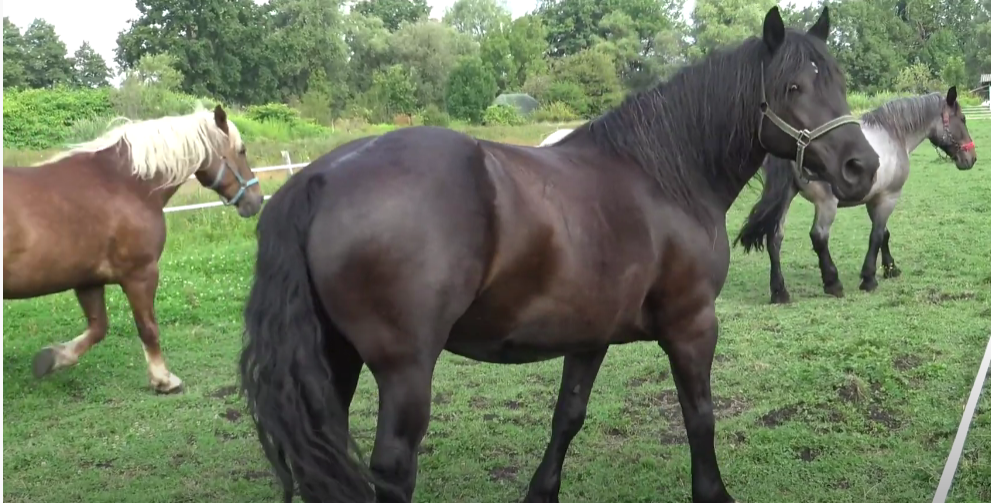
Different colour variants of Slovenian Cold-blood, with bay or black horses being the most widespread.

This medium-sized cold-blood has larger and frequently to a certain degree convex head profile, as well as well placed long neck. Its wide, deep and robust body is long and well connected, with its croup being low and split up. Firm legs have well-developed joints. The average weight is 550–650 kilograms, with some heavier individuals of Slovenian Cold-blood exceeding the weight of one metric tonne. Stallions are a bit bigger than mares, in average reaching around 155 centimetres of height, with mares having average height of about 150 centimetres. All possible colours except for pinto (skewbald) are allowed. Most of Slovenian Cold-bloods are either bay or black, with white facial markings (such as blaze and stripe) being relatively common.

== Usage ==
Slovenian Cold-bloods are mostly used for production of horse meat, with foals being raised for slaughter at young age. Mares are frequently bred for giving milk and production of dairy products. Since Slovenian Cold-blood is primarily a breed of cold-blooded type, some horses are still used as typical draft horses, helping farmers on their farms, working with foresters, pulling a carriage and performing other tasks that require physical strength of strong working animals. Only rarely Slovenian Cold-bloods are being saddled and used as riding horses.

== See also ==
- List of Slovenian domestic animal breeds
- List of horse breeds
- Horses in Slovenia
