= Horses in Slovenia =

Slovenian equine culture and equestrianism

Horses in Slovenia (Slovene: konji v Sloveniji) are represented above all by the traditional Lipizzan breed, inherited from Austria-Hungary; like Austria, Slovenia claims the Lipizzan as its national symbol. Horses have long been present on Slovenian territory; draft horses suffered a sharp decline in the 20th century, with only the native breeds of Slovenian Cold-blood and Posavina surviving. Slovenian breeders also have sport horses, such as the Slovenian Saddlebred and the Ljutomer Trotter. Slovenians distinguish their native horse breeds from traditional breeds.

The mechanized agriculture led to a marked decline in the number of horses, followed by an increase in the 21st century, to a herd of around 20 000 head in the 2000s. Slovenia has developed its equestrian tourism sector, in particular at the Lipica Stud Farm. Equestrian sports are practiced here, particularly combined combined driving and dressage. It's also a country where hippophagy is practiced. The horse, and the Lipizzan in particular, features prominently in Slovenian literature and in local traditions inherited from Slavic mythology.

== History ==
Horses have been present in Slovenia for a very long time. Equine remains dating back to the Hallstatt culture have been found in Dolenjska, in the south-east of the current country, putting in evidence the symbolic role of horses associated with male power in late prehistory. In some archaeological sites on Slovenian territory have been found 28 iron bridle bits dating from the early Middle Ages, as well as stirrups and spurs. Slovenian bits from this period are characterized by a thick barrel. The first written mention of a local breed, the Karst horse, dates back to the 15th century.

Slovenian horses have long been used for agricultural and forestry works, with draft horses representing the majority of the herd until recently. Under Austria-Hungary, the local herd was crossed with imported Belgian and Noriker horses. The Slovenian horse population reached a maximum of 60 000 at its peak. Most national breeders' associations were reorganized after 1962.

The advent of motorized farming led to a sharp decline in the horse population. The number of horses increased again at the beginning of the 21st century, thanks to a favorable breeding dynamic. In 2004, Slovenia had around 20 000 horses.

== Usage ==
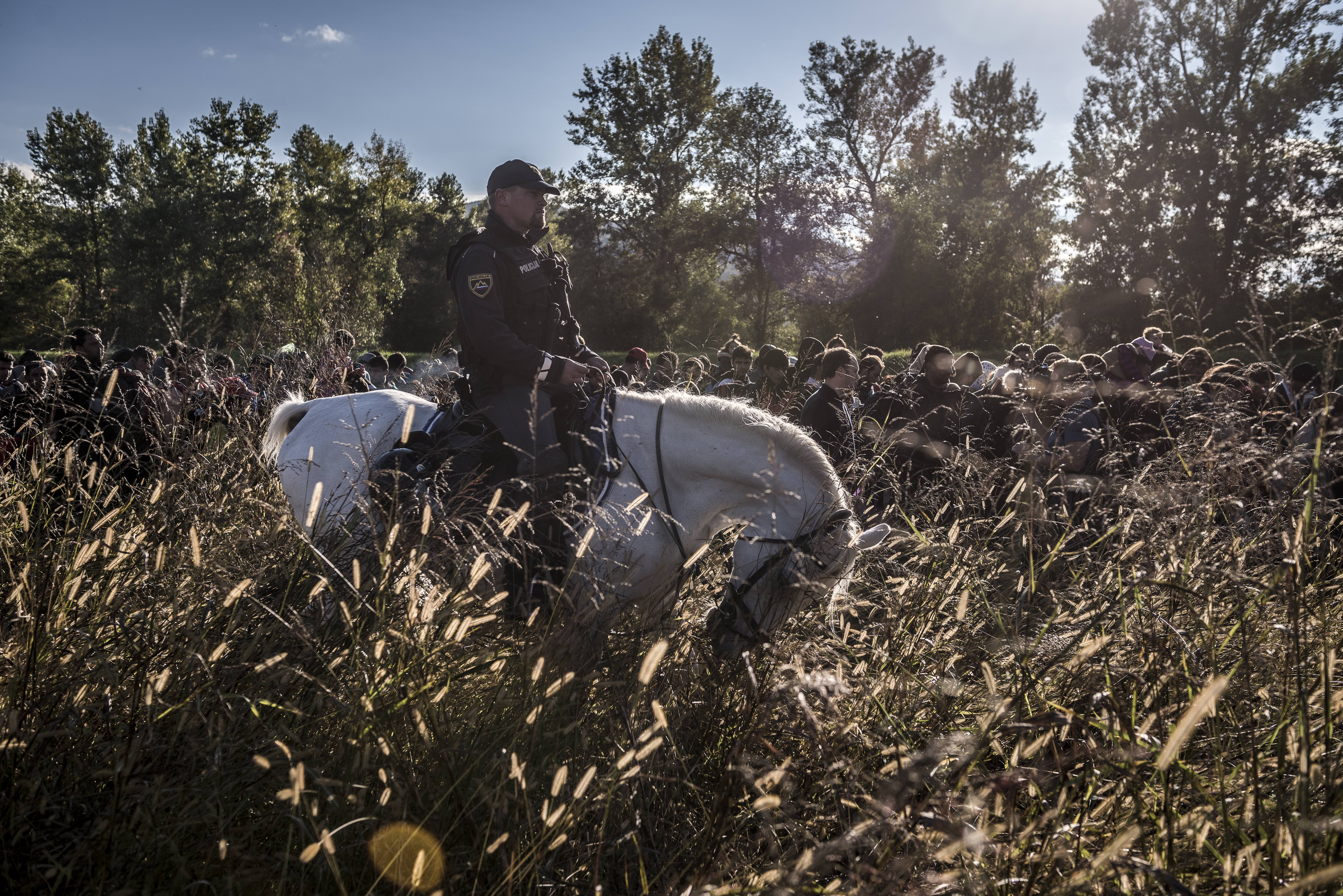
Slovenian mounted police escorting refugees to the country's border

The historical existence of equestrian activities on Slovenian territory implies the presence of numerous related services, such as veterinary medicine, equine nutrition, horse management education, agricultural usage of horses, equestrian sports sector, leisure riding, equine-assisted therapy, and various state and non-state institutions linked to riding and horses.

In 2004, there were 54 riding centers in Slovenia, and 53 trail riding. Slovenia has also had mounted police units since 1920, which take part in various law enforcement missions, patrolling streets and parks.

=== Horse racing ===
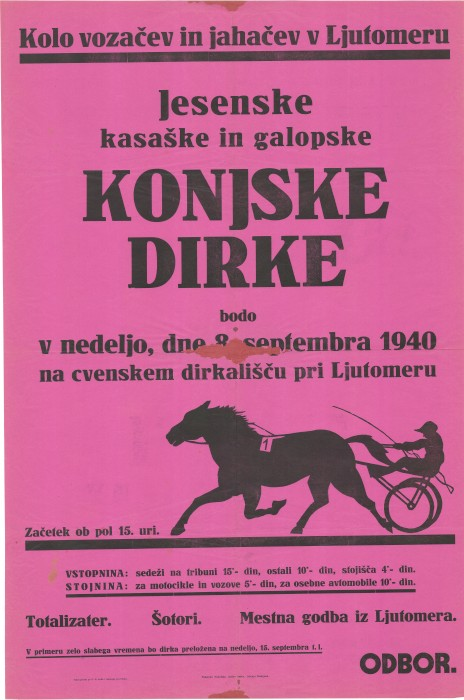
Poster for a trotting race in Ljutomer in 1940

The first developments in horse racing in Slovenia date back to 1875, with the founding of a trotting association in Ljutomer, which organized the first races. Trotting is a Slovenian tradition. They are managed by the Union of Trotters of Slovenia, which, as its name suggests, deals exclusively with trotters, and maintains the competition calendar and the practice of this sport, formerly throughout Yugoslavia.

Horse racing became very popular after the transition of government in 1991. In 2004, Slovenia had a total of 14 trotting clubs. There are 11 racetracks in the country, with a total of 25 competition days and 300 horses licensed to compete each year. Slovenian trotters perform well on the international sporting scene, with the best racing in Italy, Austria and Germany.

The development of gallop racing is much more recent, and remains private. Horse betting was in its development phase in 2004.

=== Equestrian sports ===
The development of equestrian sports is also recent, accompanying the country's transition in 1991.

The Slovenian Equestrian Federation, based in Ljubljana, was founded in 1949 and has been a full member of the International Federation for Equestrian Sports (FEI by its acronym in French) since 1992.It manages all equestrian competitions, with the exception of trotting races. It issues riders and horses with licenses, and determines and publishes the results of the competitions it organizes.

In 2010, Slovenia organized dressage and combined driving competitions. In particular, dressage competitions are organized in Lipica, which also presents its horses at international events. Despite a long history of experience in combined driving, competitive combined driving is still in its infancy, and as of 2022 the country has yet to win a medal at either the World Equestrian Games or the Olympic Games.

=== Equestrian tourism ===
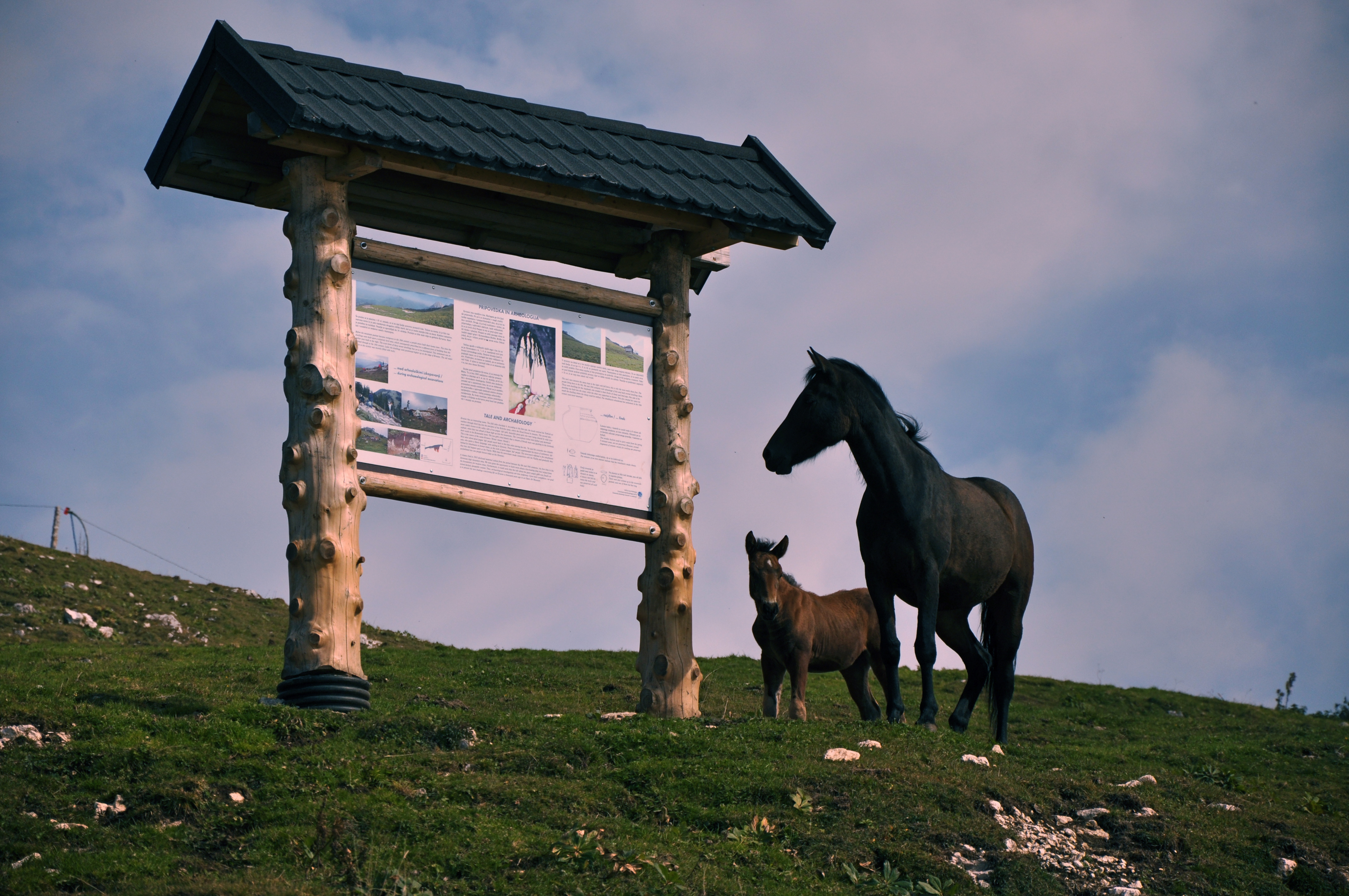
Tourist information panel on a hiking trail in Slovenia

The equestrian tourism sector is well developed, with (in 2019) around 30 stud farms or equestrian farms welcoming tourists to rural areas of Slovenia, as part of agritourism practices. Quality of food, drink and hospitality are decisive factors in maintaining this activity.

=== Hippophagy ===
A hippophagy country, Slovenia slaughters (in 2018) around 300 to 500 foals each year; 1 100 Slovenian horses and 200 to 300 foals are exported to Italy each year for slaughter, where the prices offered are higher. In 2018, there is a grey market for horse meat whose identification documents do not comply with traceability rules.

The nutritional value of Posavina meat has been studied: 100 grams of Posavina meat contain 72.44 ± 1.94 g of water, 1.96 ± 2.33 g of fat, and 21.52 ± 1.30 g of protein; the article concludes that "horse meat expresses an extremely beneficial fatty acid composition", justifying its use in human food.

Slovenian gastronomy offers a number of dishes based on horse meat, including horse steak (žrebičkov zrezek). Its consumption is particularly well established in the Karst and Carniola regions. There is also a small Slovenian fast-food chain selling horse meat specialties, particularly burgers in Ljubljana.

== Breeding ==
Most horse breeding in Slovenia takes place at small stables, where brood mares are brought to be impregnated by licensed stallions. On average, each stable has one or two stallions. Artificial insemination concerns a small number of mares (in 2004). During the 2003 breeding season, 5 868 mares were presented to 337 licensed stallions at these breeding stables. Approval of a stallion is based on a quality control of its semen.

At the beginning of the 21st century, Slovenia developed an information system to identify the country's horses.

The DAD-IS database identifies sixteen horse breeds currently or formerly bred in Slovenia. It is customary to distinguish between native breeds, which are proven to be native to Slovenian territory, and traditional breeds, which are not proven to be native. All Slovenian horse breeds have been genotyped, with the greatest variations in genotype frequency being found in draft horse breeds.

=== Native breeds ===
==== Lipizzan ====
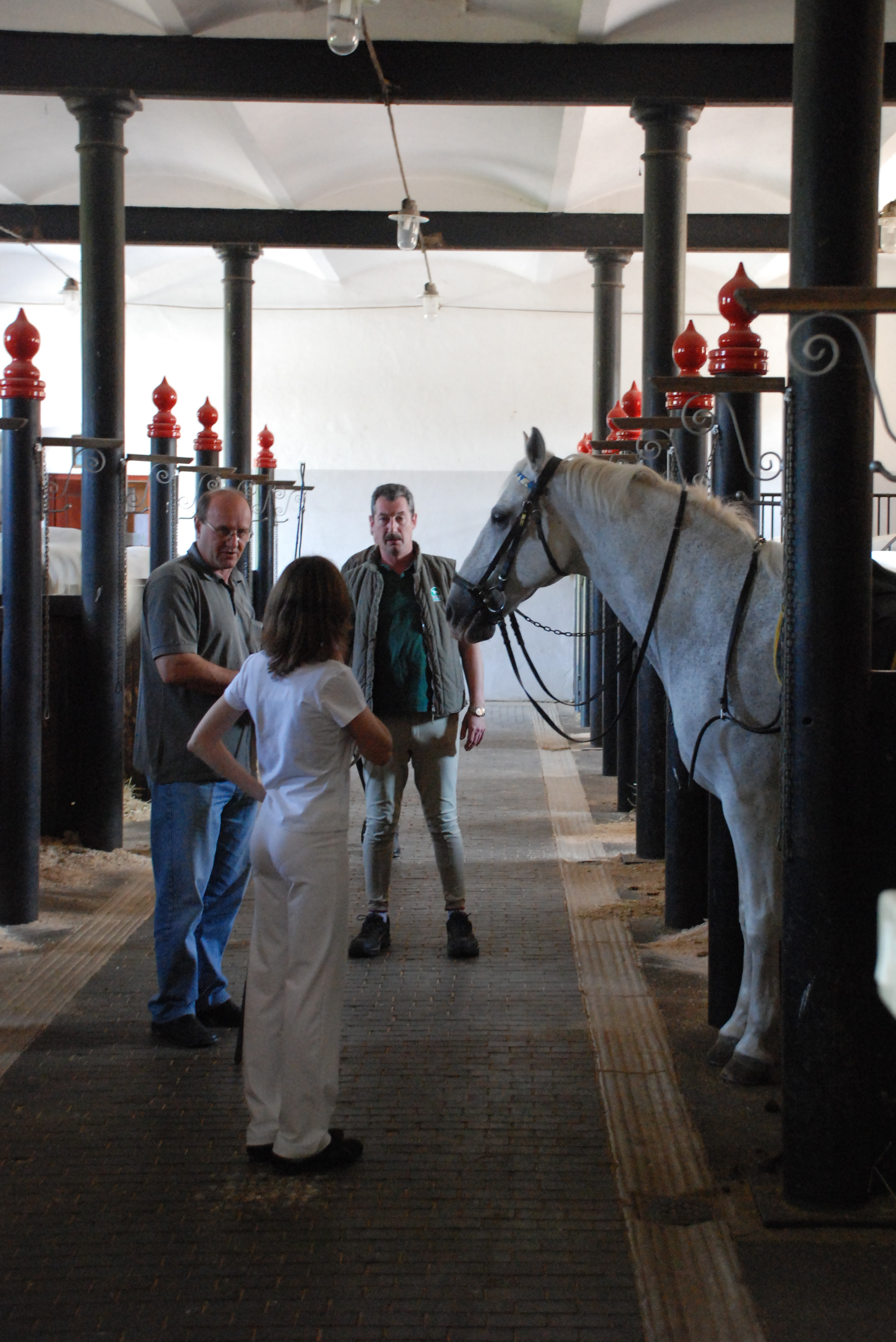
Equestrian tourism at the Lipica Stud Farm

Slovenia is particularly renowned for breeding the Lipizzan (lipicanec; lipicanski konj), the longest-established horse breed in Slovenia, bred from the Karst horse at Lipica stud farms. The International Lipizzan Federation (LIF) was founded in 1986 in Lipica. In 1996, Slovenia assumed responsibility for the development and protection of the Lipizzan. Since then, all breeding associations have had to apply to the Republic of Slovenia for permission to use the name "Lipizzan". The country obtained protection of the breed name, with a Protected Geographical Indication, in 1999. However, it does not have a monopoly on studbook management. The Lipizzan stallions present at Lipica belong to the breed's six traditional lineages, with mares representing 16 families. There are 1 253 Lipizzans registered in Slovenia in 2021. Consanguinity is monitored.

==== Slovenian Saddlebred ====
The Slovenian Saddlebred or Slovenian hot-blooded (slovenski toplokrvni konj) is the national sport horse, bred from 1978 onwards at the Krumperk Castle stud farm from imported Hanoverian horses, in response to the Slovenians' desire to have their own studbook of sport horses. The Breed Association was formed in 1993, with a base of 225 members and 600 horses. By 2021, 750 horses of this breed will be registered.

==== Bosnian mountain horse or Balkan ====
The Bosnian, or "Balkan mountain horse", is the oldest horse breed in the Balkans and is considered a native breed in Slovenia. It is particularly present in Rtiče. In 2021, 306 heads of this breed were recorded, putting it in danger of extinction.

==== Draft horses ====
Introduction of a native Slovenian horse breed: Slovenian Cold-blood

Introduction of a native Slovenian horse breed: Posavina

In 2005, draft horse breeding accounted for 80% of Slovenia's total horse population, including the Haflinger. Some Slovenian Cold-blood horse breeds are extinct.

The endangered Slovenian Cold-blood horse (Slovenski hladnokrvni konj) is the most commonly found draft horse breed, with a studbook in existence since 1962 and 3 050 animals listed in 2021. They are bred for meat and for farm work.

The Posavina, a cross-border breed of draft horse, is descended from the Belgian Draft and bred in Croatia and Slovenia, on the floodplains of the Save River. Preservation efforts date back to the 1990s and have proved effective, as the herd has steadily increased between 2006 and 2017. In 2021, a total of 1 980 animals of this breed were registered. The breed association was founded in 2005. The Slovenian Posavina population is very similar to the Croatian population, with an average height of 1 419 cm, and a bay, dark bay, chestnut, gray or black coat. In 2005, most of the Slovenian Trait breeding stallions were state-owned.

The very rare Međimurje (medzimurski konj) is extinct in Slovenia, as well as the Bohinj, Kobarid and Alpin.

=== Traditional breeds ===
==== Trotters ====
Slovenia has been breeding trotters since 1884, specially at Ljutomer. There is a Slovenian National Trotter (kasaški konj), considered a traditional breed, of which 425 were registered in 2021. The Ljutomer Trotter (Ljutomerski kasac), another traditional breed, is a critically endangered type of trotter derived from crosses between the Anglo-Arabian and the Standardbred, now bred throughout the country, but originally from Ljutomer, in the Mur region.

==== Haflinger ====
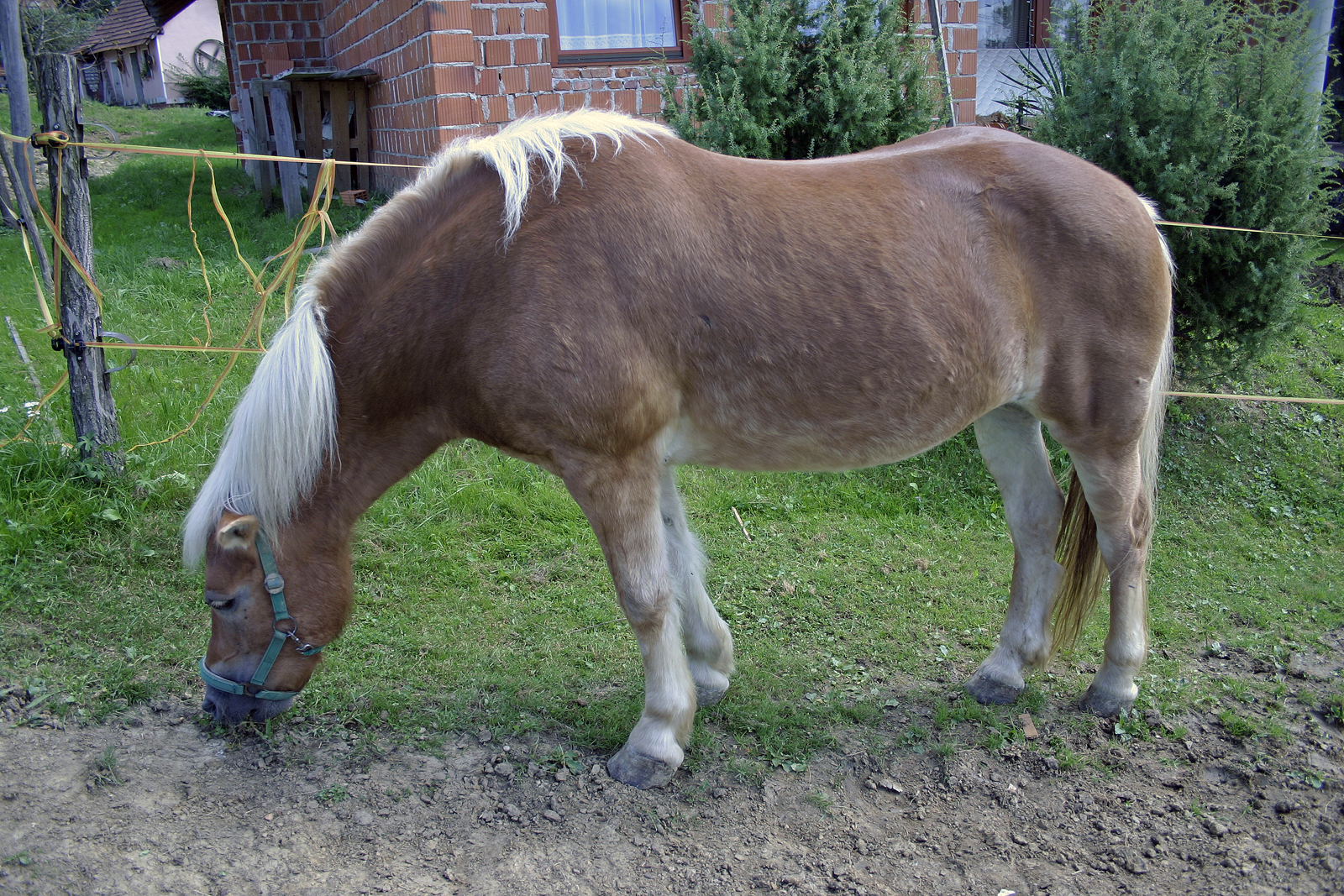
A Haflinger in Prosečka Vas

The Haflinger (haflinški konj), considered a traditional breed, has been bred since the 1950s for combined combined driving and pack in the mountains. It is also used as a mount for children and young people. In the 1970s, the Slovenian government imported 181 mares and 29 stallions of this breed to meet the needs of agriculture and tourism. In 2004, around 1 000 Haflingers were bred in Slovenia, with the number expected to fall to 550 by 2021, following a decline in the herd over several years. The Haflinger association also manages draft horse breeds. Almost all Haflinger stallions are owned by the state, and are kept at public studs throughout the country. Slovenian Haflinger breeding is specifically aimed at the tourist market.

==== Other breeds ====
Finally, Slovenia breeds Thoroughbreds (angleški polnokrvni konj), Arabians (arabski (polnokrvni) konj), Hanoverians (Hannoverian), Icelandics (islandski konj) and Norikers (Noric).

The number of non-purebred Arabian horses was expected to reach 70 in 2021, with a stable trend, compared with 325 purebred Arabians in the same year. Slovenia would have around 400 Icelandic and 200 English Thoroughbreds in 2021. Hanoverian and Noriker numbers are unknown.

=== Associations and state support for breeding ===
In 2004, eleven breeders' associations were active. The oldest is the association of draft horse and Haflinger breeders. It is followed by the Lipizzan Breeders' Association, the Posavina Breeders' Association, the Slovenian Sport horse Breeders' Association, the Arabian Breeders' Association, the Thoroughbred Breeders' Association, the Icelandic Breeders' Association, the Quarter Horse Breeders' Association and the Slovenian Trotter Breeders' Union.

Studbook management and horse selection are handled by the National Breeding Service, attached to the Veterinary Faculty, with financial support from the Slovenian Ministry of Agriculture. Technical support, particularly for testing horses, is provided by the Lipica Stud Farm, the Krumperk national horse breeding center and the Prestranek center.

=== Diseases and parasites ===
According to analyses carried out in 2005, the Slovenian Arabian horse herd is free from the mutation responsible for severe combined immunodeficiency.

Licensed breeding horses are screened by veterinarians for equine infectious anemia and equine viral arteritis, and mares for metritis. Infections with methicillin-resistant Staphylococcus aureus are not a matter of veterinary concern, as these infections are very rare.

== Culture ==
Horses are present in Slovenian mythology and popular traditions, in Slovenian literature, on coins and stamps.

There is a rivalry between Austria and Slovenia to claim the Lipizzan as a national symbol.

=== The horse in Slovenian mythology and Christianity ===
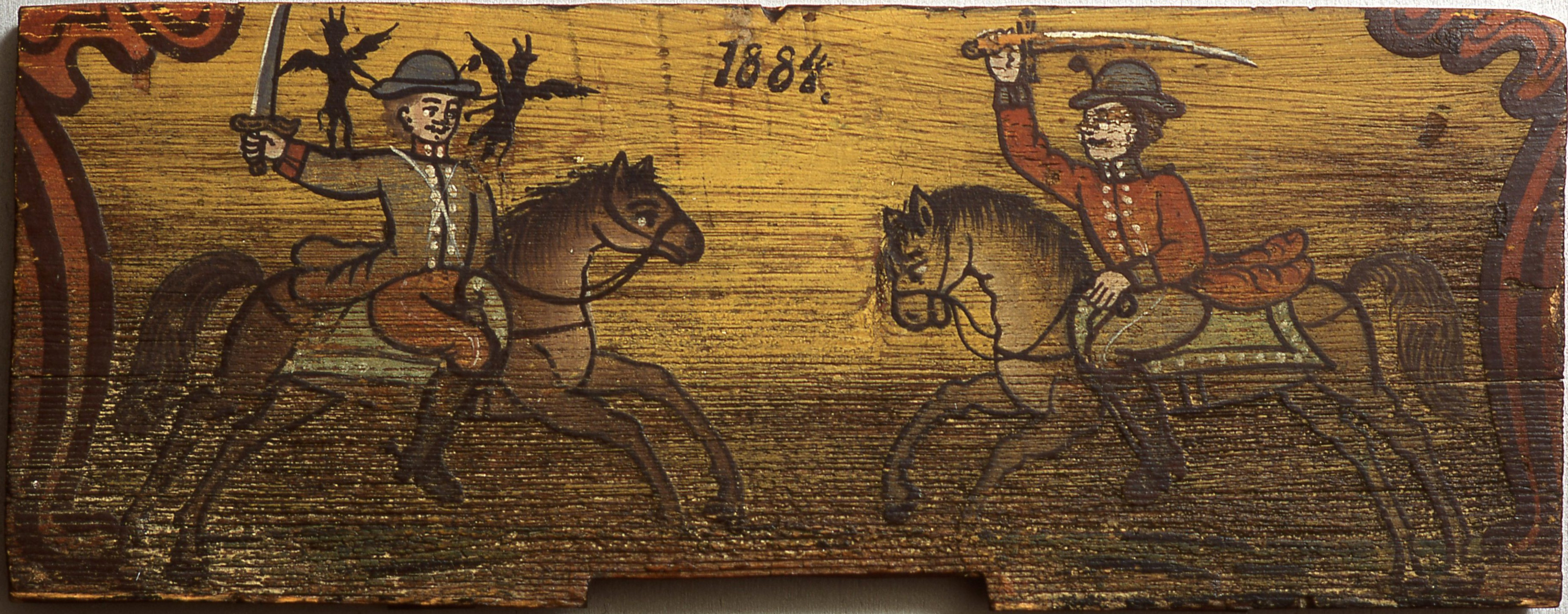
Decorative wooden panel depicting the fight between the demon Pegam and the Slovenian hero Lambergar, in the Radovljica beekeeping museum

According to mythologist and folklorist Monika Kropej, Slovenia's mythopoeia heritage, which gives the horse a prominent place in its songs and rituals, suggests an ancient cosmogonic role for this animal at solstice time, probably in connection with Perun, God of thunder and ruler of cosmic forces. Kropej points out that the winter and summer solstices, the beginning of spring and autumn, are all marked by the image of the horse in Slovenian heritage.

The Slovenian half-horse tradition has similar roots to the legends concerning centaurs; it is mainly preserved in Styria, Upper Carniola and Friuli-Venezia Giulia.

The oldest surviving carnival mask in Slovenia is that of the mare Rusa. In and around Slavnica, Rusa was carried around the village during folk songs.

St. John's Eve is announced by Kresnik, who was born with horse hooves and often wears the image of this animal.

==== Beli konj ====
The legend of Beli konj ("the white horse") tells of treasures hidden in the valley between Triglav and Vršac. According to this legend, an old hunter and a shepherd are climbing a mountain in search of treasure, when thunder rings out: a white horse stands where they want to dig. A thick fog envelops them, and everywhere they look, they see this horse before them. The fog lifts, and thanks to the horse, they make it out alive. To find the treasure, the white horse must be killed with the first bullet, when the first ray of light strikes its mane. The treasure's gold will be plentiful, and flowers will grow from the blood of the slain horse. The cattle that eat it will be fat and healthy, and the one who plucks such a flower will be happy for the rest of his life.

The source of this legend seems to be Zlatorog, who takes on the appearance of the white horse, the golden stag and others. He is mortally wounded by a human being, but a miraculous flower of life springs from his blood, reviving him and restoring his vital force.

==== The cult of St. George and Jarnik in Slovenia ====
Carnival, during which horse masks are often seen, heralds the arrival of spring, and St. George, riding a white mare, defeats a dragon, combined driving winter out of the country. According to Slovenian mythical legends, St. George has a brother, the mythical hunter Jarnik, also called Bartolomej (Bartholomew) or even Jurij s pušo (George with a gun) by the Slavs. With the arrival of autumn, Jarnik slaughters a white horse, a goat or a chamois, symbolizing the sun, destined to be reborn at Christmas in the form of a young sun or foal. Jarnik also leads the Wild Hunt, and thus the horses that hide in the skies.

The cult of St. George in Slovenia probably replaced that of a pagan deity, perhaps Vesnik or Yarilo. In his role as dragon-slayer, St. George replaced Gromovnik (thundermaker), the God of thunder in Slavic mythology. St. George is present in Slovenian folk songs and in a fairy tale, all of which mention the horse.

==== The cult of St. Stephen ====
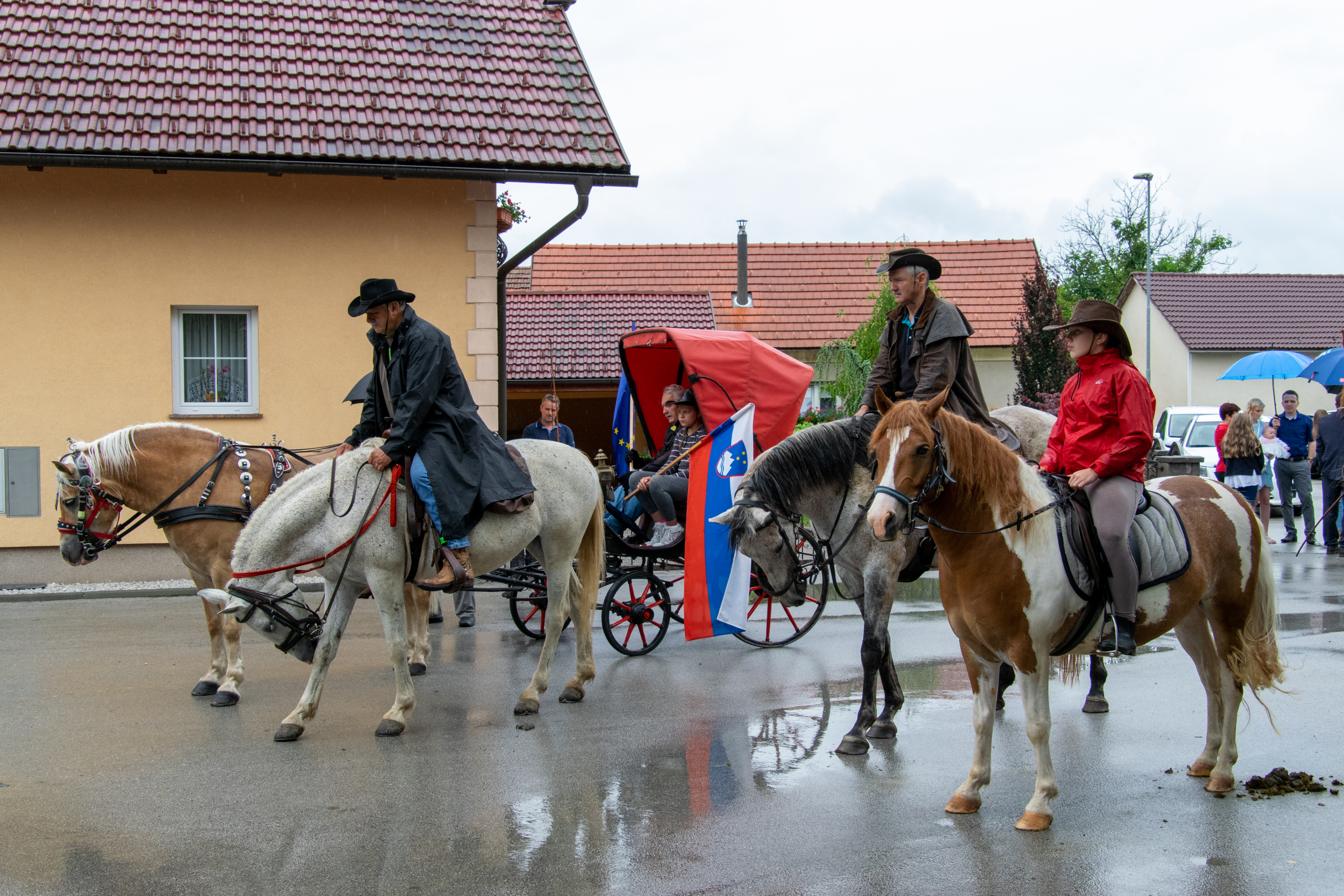
Blessing of horses in Slovenia

Three types of Slovenian song about St. Stephen link his martyrdom to the sacrifice of a horse.

In Slovenia, Christmas is heralded by St. Stephen, the local patron saint of horses. Slovenian legends also have it that King Herod ordered St. Stephen to be captured and tied to a beech tree in the middle of a green forest, where a wild white horse was to tear him to pieces. But when the horse spots St. Stephen, it calms down and follows him to a castle. Finally, the king orders him stoned to death. Horses also pull a coffin containing the deceased saint, as depicted at Utik, near Ljubljana.

On St. Stephen's Day, horse breeders begin pilgrimages linked to their animals. Horses are blessed in many of Slovenia's holy places, and people bring offerings such as horse statuettes or money to the churches. This custom has been perpetuated in Štepanja Vas, near Ljubljana, and used to take place in many places in Slovenia, with believers sacrificing small wax horses. A sacrificial role is attributed to the horse on this date.

==== The Christmas horse ====
During the Advent of St. Nicholas Day, as described by Jože Vršnik, the Saint rides into the houses on a white horse. The Christmas horse is then freed and born. White Carniolan Christmas carols tell of a black stallion on which sits a boy wearing a silver cap or sash. According to Monika Kropej, "the most obvious vestiges" of the belief in the Christmas horse can be found in the tradition of the Christmas foal in Šavrin and Gažon, who comes in the evening to eat hay under the table. In Brkini, a basket full of hay is prepared for the Christmas foal the night before.

=== Horses in Slovenian literature ===
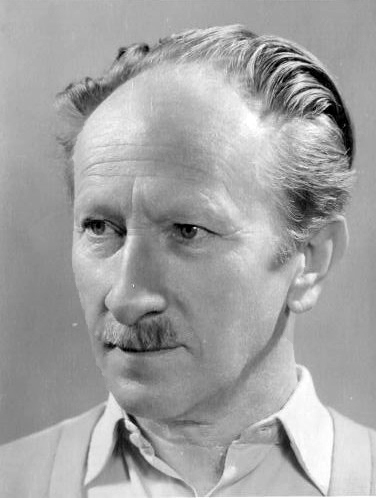
Slovenian poet Edvard Kocbek, author of Lipicanci in 1969

The Lipizzan is the main subject of Slovenian writer Edvard Kocbek's poem Lipicanci (1969). According to literature professor Marjetka Golež Kaučič, this poem is set in the context of a symbolic description of the horse as a national symbol, and contains no critical discourse. In his introduction to the poem, Boris A. Novak describes it as one of Kocbek's most typical works, as well as an "exalted ode" that deepens to "reach mythological dimensions" and "make the Lipizzan a sacred animal".

Poet and playwright Boris A. Novak wrote a satirical play entitled Lipicanci gredo v Strasbourg ("Lipizzans go to Strasbourg") in 2008. In this play, the Lipizzans go to the European Court of Human Rights and demand justice because their habitat is shrinking, they suffer from commercial tourism, are mistreated and become a mere means of generating profit. In this play, the horses are taken seriously by the court, and bring a complaint against Slovenia as well as all the other countries to which Lipica has belonged since 1580. According to Kaučič's analysis, Novak "inscribes in his play a severe criticism of Slovenian policy towards Lipizzans", including the complete commercialization of Lipica and the exploitation of the horses for tourism and profit. She concludes that "horses as living creatures do not exist in the neoliberal capitalist world". Kaučič brings this piece closer to ecocriticism, in that it carries the voice of the Lipizzans themselves, as free entities worthy of decent treatment. In 2006, Slovenian poet Miklavž Komelj published the poem series Hippidrom, which also carries an anti-speciesist, ecocritical message.

=== Slovenian coins and stamps ===
The Lipizzan is also depicted on the face of Slovenian 20-cent coins; one of the aims of this depiction is to weaken the historical link between Austria and the Lipizzan, to present it as a Slovenian national horse breed. In his book, Dutch journalist Frank Westerman describes the outraged reaction of Austrian tourists when they discovered this representation of the Lipizzan on Slovenian coins. The 10-tolar coin, the national currency that preceded the euro, also depicts a horse, with the word EQUUS.

Slovenia issued a postage stamp in honor of Lipizzan and Lipica in 1993.

== See also ==
- Hippophagy
- Lipizzan
- Bosnian Mountain Horse
- Slovenian Cold-blood
- Posavina
- Ljutomer Trotter

== Bibliography ==
- Van der Honing, Ynze (2004). Book Of Abstracts Of The 55th Annual Meeting Of The European Association For Animal Production : Bled, Slovenia. Wageningen Academic Pub. ISBN 90-76998-45-0.
- Kaučič, Marjetka (2018). "The Lipizzaner Horse: Cultural and Natural Heritage or Free Non-Human Subjectivity". Studia mythologica Slavica. 21: 163–188. doi:10.3986/sms.v21i0.7072. ISSN 1581-128X. S2CID 239904868.
- Kropej, Monika (1998). "Konj kot kozmološko bitje v slovenskem mitopoetičnem izročilu" [The Horse as a Cosmological Creature in the Slovene Mythopoetic Heritage]. Studia mythologica Slavica (in Slovenian). 1: 153–167. doi:10.3986/sms.v1i0.1871. ISSN 1581-128X.
- Porter, Valerie; Alderson, Lawrence; Hall, Stephen; Sponenberg, Dan (2016). Mason's World Encyclopedia of Livestock Breeds and Breeding (6th ed.). CAB International. ISBN 978-1-84593-466-8. OCLC 948839453.
- Prišenk, Jernej; Filipič, Nina; Rozman, Črtomir; Pažek, Karmen (1971). "Evaluation of Traditional and Indigenous Horse Breeds for Wider Intended Use: Case Study from Slovenia". Sustainability. 14 (4): 1971. doi:10.3390/su14041971. ISSN 2071-1050.
- Rousseau, Élise (2016). Guide des chevaux d'Europe. Delachaux et Niestlé. ISBN 978-2-603-02437-9.
