= Posavac =

Breed of horse

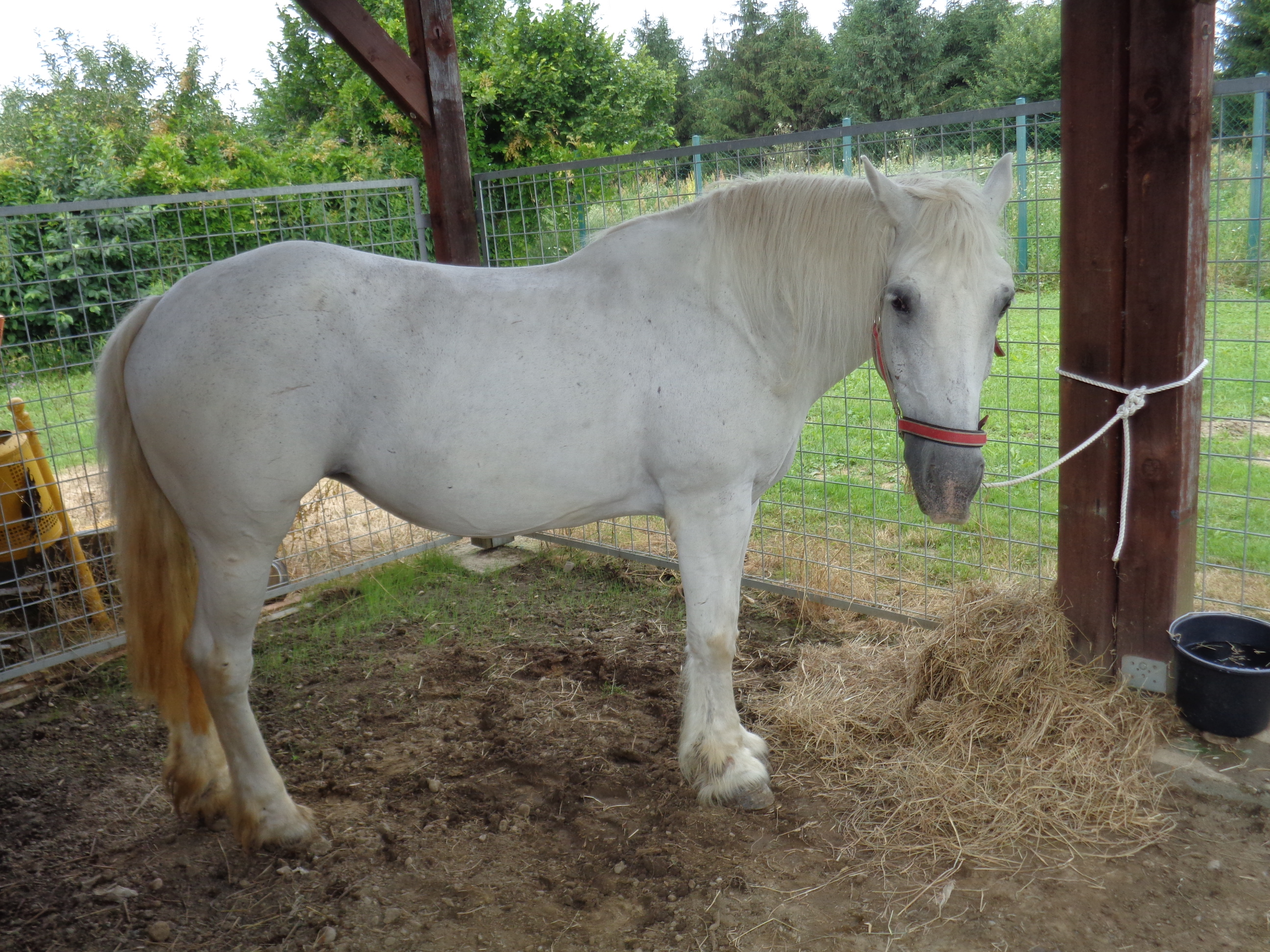

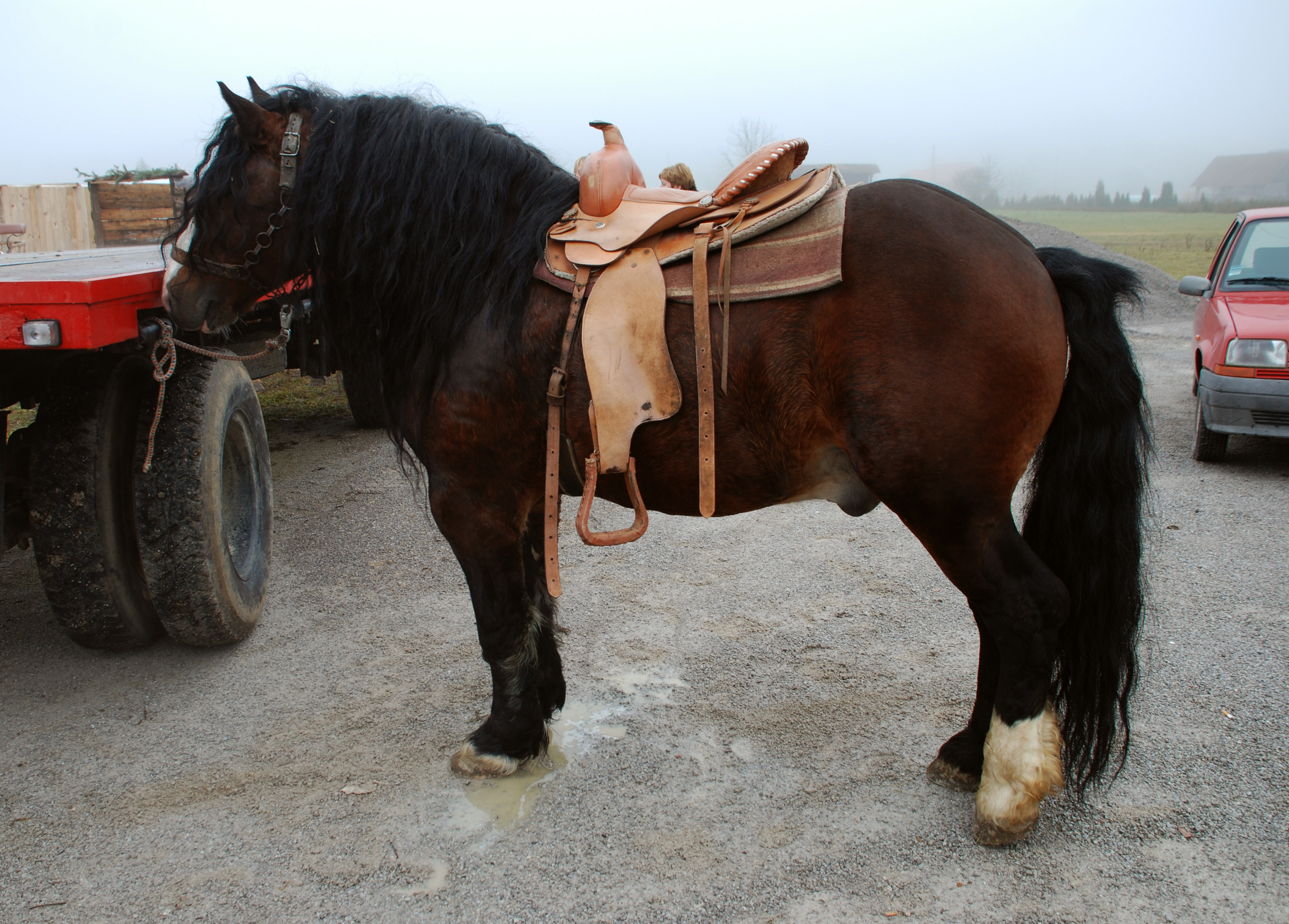
- Other names: Croatian Posavac; Croatian Posavina; Croatian: Hrvatski posavac; Slovene: Posavski konj
- Country of origin: Croatia
- Distribution: Croatia; Slovenia; Bosnia and Herzegovina
- Use: draught; tourist attraction; meat

Traits
- Weight: Male: average 600 kg; Female: average 500 kg
- Height: Male: average 143.5 cm; Female: average 140.8 cm

Breed standards
- Croatian Posavina Horse Society

The Posavac or Posavina, also known as the Croatian Posavac and the Croatian Posavina (Croatian: Hrvatski posavac, Slovene: Posavski konj or Posavec), is a breed of medium-sized draught horse with a high capacity for weight pulling. Throughout its history, the breed has been popular for pulling wagons. It is also used for forestry, agricultural and other work.

== History ==
The breed was developed in Posavina, a region alongside the Sava river in Croatia. It was based on a local Slavonian-Posavian horse breed called bušak (bushak), whose mares were crossbred to quality stallions of other breeds including Arabian, Nonius, Noriker and Percheron.

The majority of Posavina horses are in Croatia, but the breed is also present in Bosnia and Herzegovina and Slovenia, where it is reared principally for meat.

The registered population of Posavina horses in Croatia was estimated at 5131 individuals in 2013., so the breed is considered endangered (FAO classification No. II). The total population in Croatia was reported to DAD-IS as 5800–6000 in 2020. In Slovenia the number was reported as 1910 in 2020.

== Characteristics ==
The Posavina horse ranges from 140 to 150 centimetres (13.3 to 14.3 hands) in height and weighs 500–600 kilograms (1,100–1,300 lb). It is smaller than two other Croatian cold-blooded horse breeds, the Međimurje horse (155–165 cm) and Croatian Coldblood (150–160 cm). The Posavina horse may be bay or seal brown, less often black or chestnut; other colours are much more rare.

The head of a Posavina is relatively small, the neck short and muscular, the shoulder deep and broad, the chest wide and deep, and the legs are short and strong, with broad hooves. The breed is known for its easy-going temperament; it is mild and patient, obedient and willing to work hard.

== See also ==
- Croatian Coldblood
- Međimurje horse
- Croatian Warmblood
- List of mammals of Croatia
- Horses in Slovenia
