= Croatian Coldblood =

Breed of horse

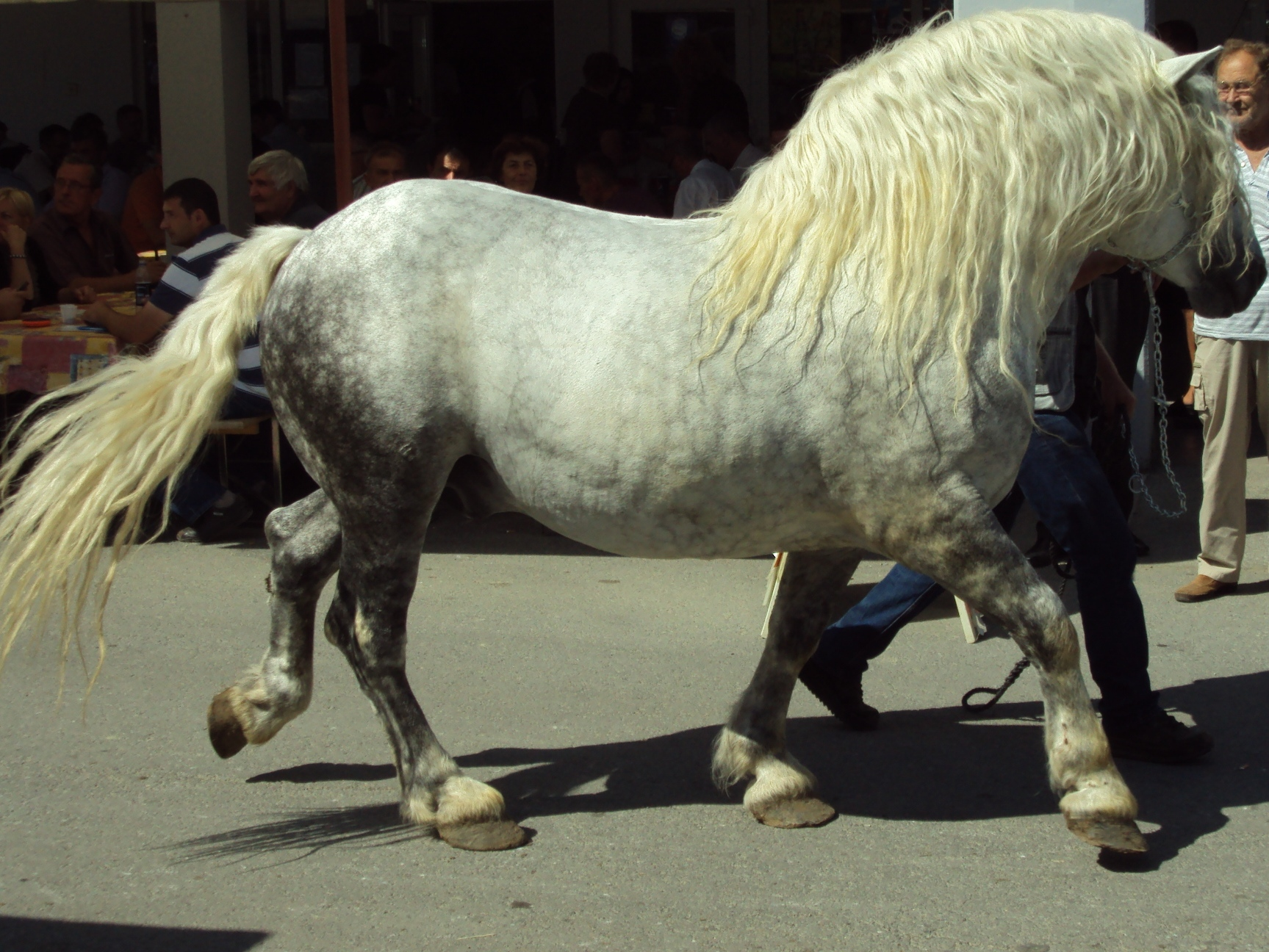
- Croatian Coldblood at a trade fair in Bjelovar
- Country of origin: Croatia

Traits
- Distinguishing features: Medium-heavy draught horse; average height 150-160 cm

Breed standards
- [http://www.agr.unizg.hr/index_eng.htm Faculty of Agriculture Zagreb]

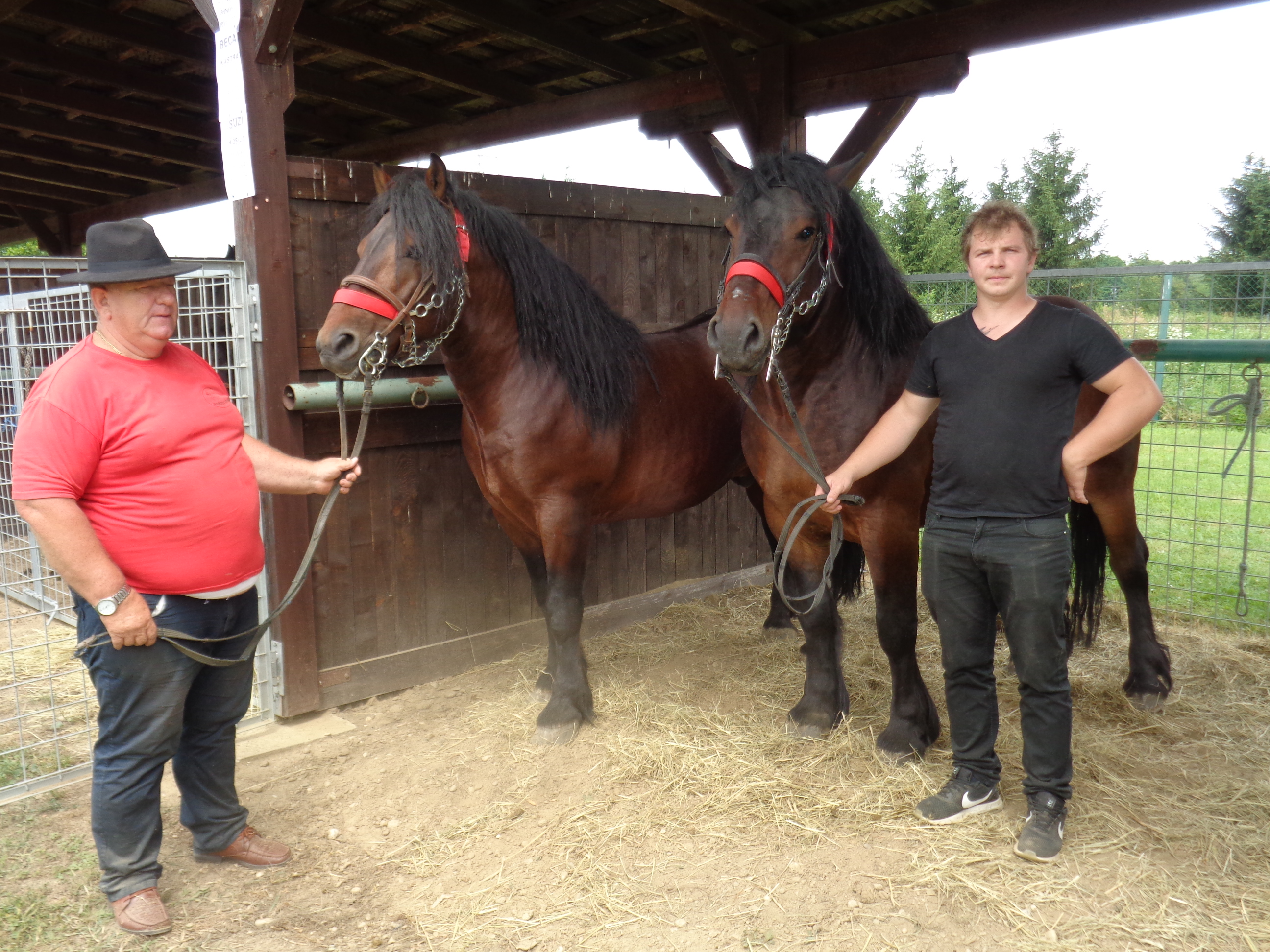
Bay Croatian Coldbloods shown at a trade fair in Nedelišće

The Croatian Coldblood (Croatian: Hrvatski hladnokrvnjak, German: Kroatisches Kaltblut) is an autochthonous medium-heavy horse breed of draught horse originating from Croatia.

== Characteristics ==
The typical Croatian Coldblood ranges from 150 centimetres (14.3 hands; 59 in) to 160 cm (15.3 h; 63 in) high. Stallions can weigh up to 850 kilograms (1,870 lb). Its head is medium-sized and refined, with small ears, but with large eyes and nostrils. It has medium short, arched and muscular neck, wide and deep chest, broad and muscular breast, as well as powerful legs with broad hooves.

Most Croatian Coldbloods are bay or seal brown. Of the remaining horses, approximately 10-15 percent are black, and less than 10 percent are chestnut, gray, flaxen chestnut, while the other colours are very rare.

They are considered mild and obedient, easy keepers, willing workers and adapt well to various conditions and climates. Earlier, they were used for pulling waggons or for work in agriculture or forestry, but today they have lost their importance as draft animals and are being widely used for horse meat production.

== History ==
The history of the breed dates back to the first half of the 19th century, when it was begun to crossbreed local warmblood mares in central Croatia with imported quality stallions of Noriker breed. Some other breeds were involved later, like Ardennes, Brabant and Percheron. At the beginning of the 20th century the breed was widespread toward east (Slavonia) and west (Gorski kotar and Istria regions).

In the last few decades, the Croatian Coldblood was the most numerous horse breed in Croatia in general. The total number of the registered population in 2008 was 5,334 or 33.77% of all horses (15,796) in Croatia. The number of horses of the breed was increased by 10.74% in the last four years, from 5,334 in 2008 to 5,907 in 2012.

== See also ==
- List of mammals of Croatia
- Međimurje horse
- Posavac horse
- Croatian Warmblood
