= Feistritz an der Gail =

Town in Carinthia, Austria

Feistritz an der Gail Bistrica na Zilji
- Municipality
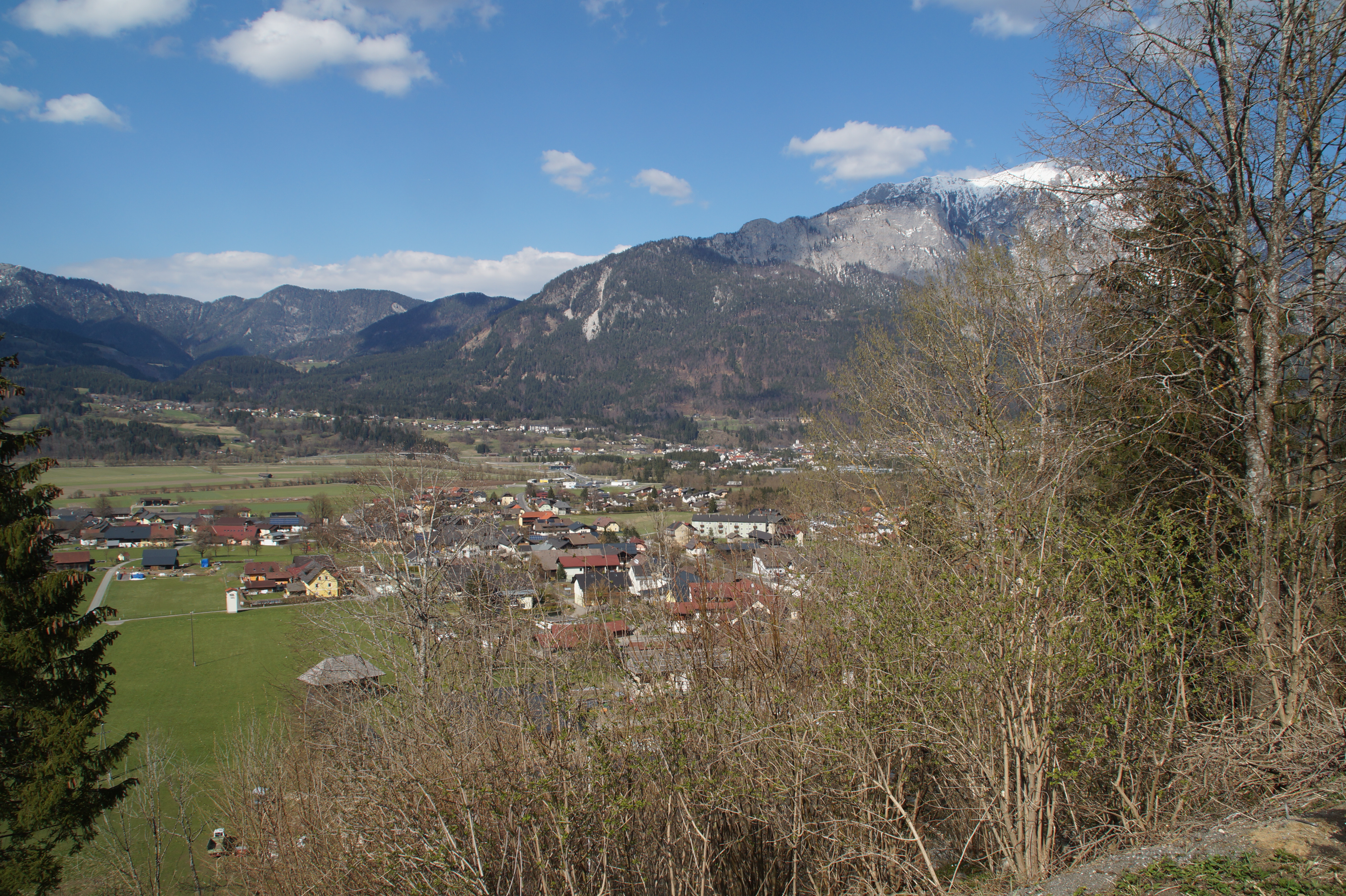

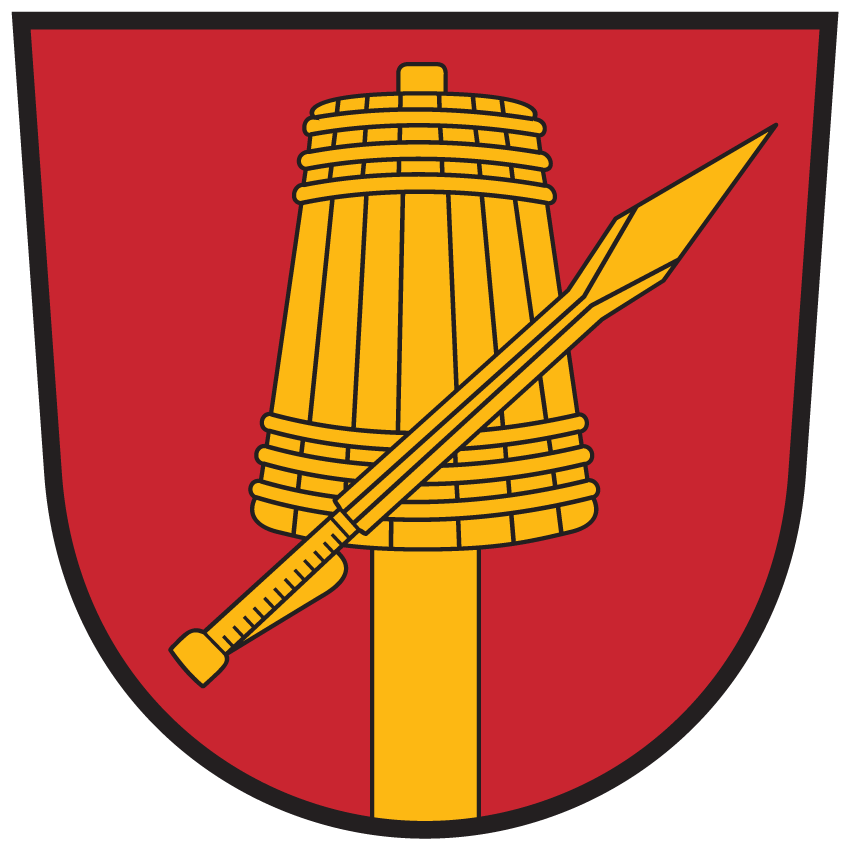
- Coat of arms

- Location within Austria
- Coordinates: 46°34′N 13°36′E
- Country: Austria
- State: Carinthia
- District: Villach-Land

Government
  - Mayor: Dieter Mörtl

Area
  - Total: 19.34 km^{2} (7.47 sq mi)
- Elevation: 638 m (2,093 ft)

Population (2018-01-01)
  - Total: 627
  - Density: 32.4/km^{2} (84.0/sq mi)
- Time zone: UTC+1 (CET)
  - Summer (DST): UTC+2 (CEST)
- Postal code: 9613
- Area code: 04256

Feistritz an der Gail (Slovene: Bistrica na Zilji), often referred to as simply Feistritz (Austrian German: [ˈfaɪstrɪts]), is a town in the district of Villach-Land in Carinthia in Austria. It is close to the borders with both Italy and Slovenia. The Black Forest to the south of the town borders the Italian comune of Tarvisio, in the Province of Udine. There are several landmarks of importance in and around the town, including Ulli's Herb Garden, the House of Bats, the Parish Church of St. Martin and Mary Magdalene's Chapel.

== Geography ==
Feistritz, the largest community in the Lower Gail Valley, covers an area of some 20 km^{2} (7.7 sq mi). It is located at an elevation of 638 m (2,093 ft). The town's population, as of 2012, was 649. The forest to the south bordering Italy is named Schwarzwald, meaning Black Forest. Nötsch im Gailtal is located approximately 1.5 miles (2.4 km) to the north of Feistritz an der Gail. The nearby Feistritzer Alm reaches a height of 1,700 m (5,600 ft) at the foot of the Oisternig (2,052 m (6,732 ft)).

== History ==
The first documented reference to Feistritz is to be found in a deed from 1119. Breeding of Noriker horses began in the 14th century as the marshy land resulting from the Dorbatsch landspill in 1348 was unsuitable for cattle. The inhabitants of the Gail Valley are known for their courage and sense of business, acquired over centuries of trade, as they transported goods from Italy to Salzburg and Bavaria. Under the rationalization of Austrian municipalities in 1973, the former Municipality of Feistritz became part of the Municipality of Hohenthurn.

== Economic developments ==
Farming is the main economic activity with small to medium-sized holdings although many of the commune's inhabitants commute to Villach or Klagenfurt. In recent years, the town has placed considerable emphasis on infrastructure development such as improving the road network and the water supply while encouraging new businesses which have provided 50 new jobs.

As part of the economic development of the town, a small hydroelectric project was taken over by the municipal government in 2007, with funds provided as grants and subsidies by Carinthia. This has resulted in an increase in environmental-friendly production by nearly 200%, compared to the earlier capacity of the station. This has also enabled to house the threatened species of bats on the first floor of the power station, a unique development in Austria. Commenting on the economic benefit of the scheme, mayor of the town, Dieter Mörtl, has observed that "energy on the spot saves transportation!"

== Landmarks ==
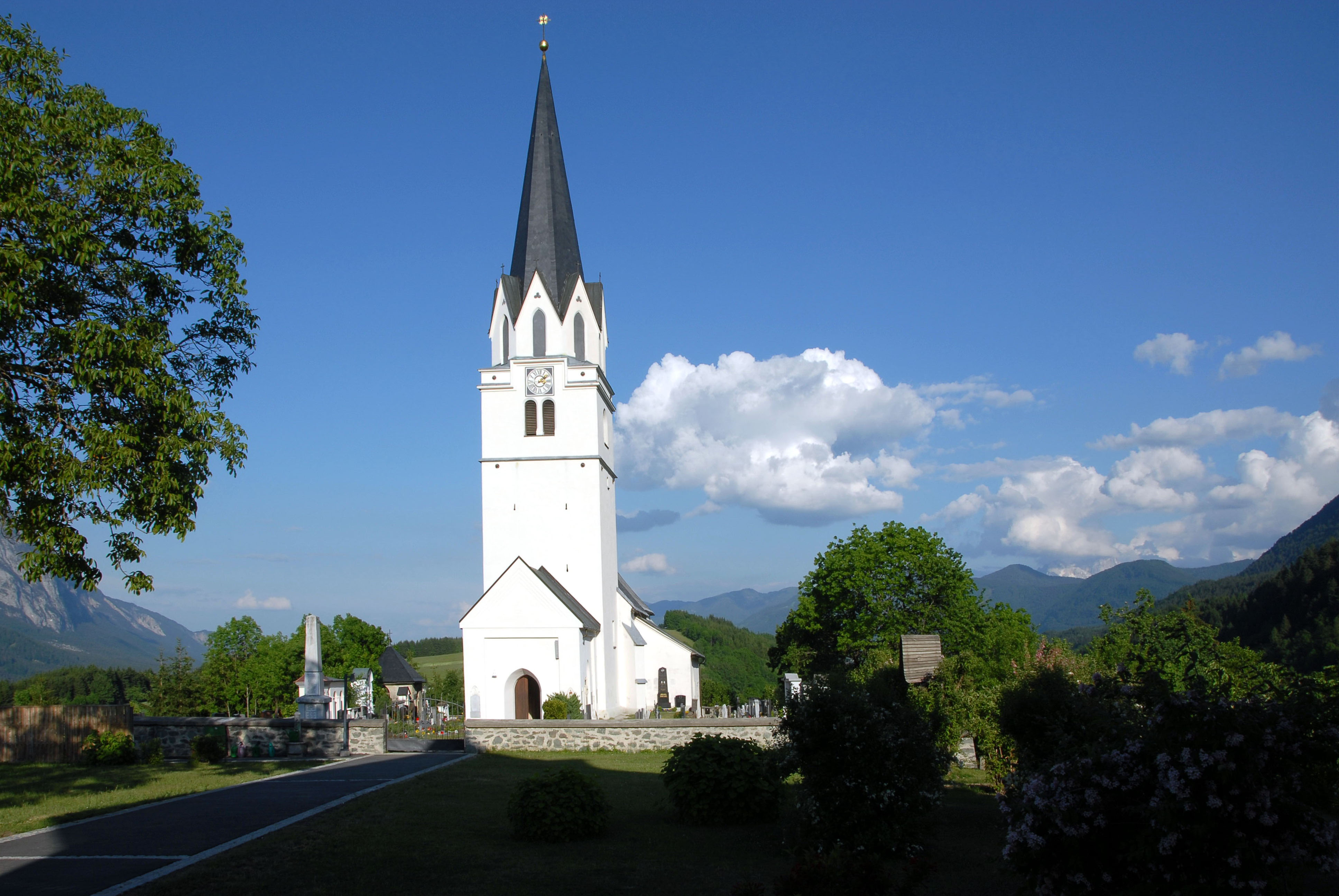
Parish church Saint Martin at Feistritz on the Gail

Feistritz is known for its Fledermaushaus (House of Bats), the first in Austria. Located some 2 km to the west of the village, the old power station which was uninhabited for a number of years now houses a colony of small horseshoe bats which can be observed inside the building.

There are several other landmarks of note in the town. These include:

- Ulli's herb garden with a wide variety of all types of herbs for the kitchen, beauty treatment, health and sweet smells.
- The Parish Church of St. Martin from the first half of the 15th century with its imposing tower and spire.
- The Chapel of Mary Magdalene, from the mid-14th century, is about a half hour's walk on the way to Feitritz Alm. According to tradition, mass is celebrated here on Easter Monday and on the feast of Mary Magdalene (22 July).
- High above the village, the Feistritzer Alm offers opportunities for walks in unspoiled surroundings. Mass is still celebrated in the little chapel at the top dedicated to Maria Schnee or Our Lady of the Snows on the Sunday following 5 August (her feast day).

== Culture ==
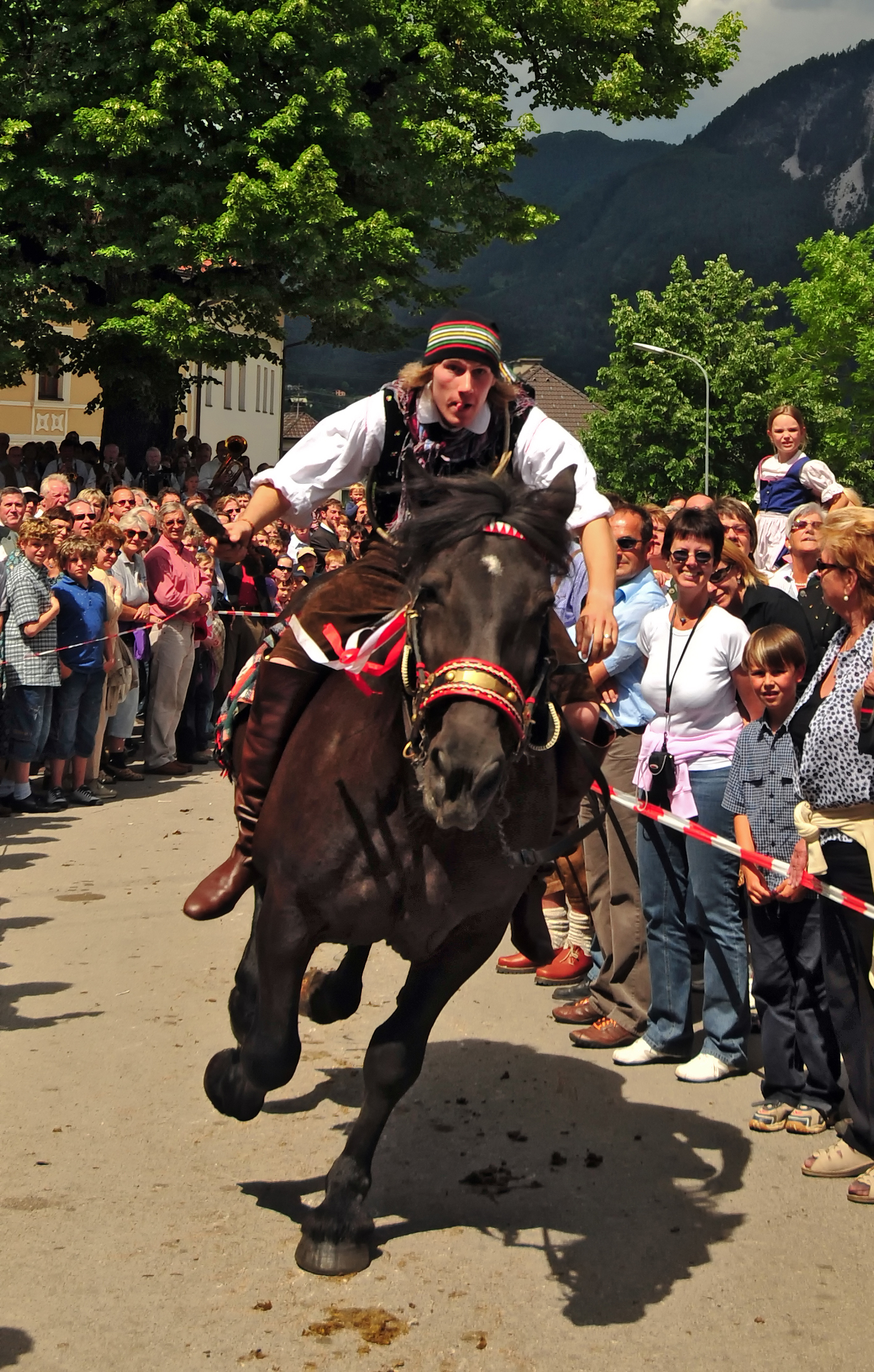
The annual Kermesse on Whit Monday.

Extensive ethnographic research has occurred over a period of 460 years. The commune is keen to support music, culture and folklore. The recently established School of Music has been a success, especially with the younger members of the community. There is also a kindergarten school. Local art is encouraged and social clubs are also established. Hallo Feistritz is the commune's local information sheet published about twice a year.

The most popular cultural activity in the town is called the "Kufenstechen", which is a customary church parish festival among the Alpine farming community. This annual event, held on Whit Monday, is celebrated in the month of May and marks the participation of unmarried men riding bareback on Noriker horses, wearing traditional costumes. The event involves horse riders striking a wooden barrel with an iron club till the last wooden splinter is felled; this involves several rounds of horse riding around the barrel till it is broken fully. The winner is given a flower wreath, which he wears on his wrist. This festival is said to be observed since 1630 AD. After the horse ride, a traditional dance festival is held under a lime tree (called the "Linde Dance") with the winner of the horse event getting the first dance. Unmarried girls participate in the dance dressed in traditional "Gailtaler" costumes. The dance is accompanied by traditional songs, some in Slovenian.

The Feistritz Festival is an important event for the parish. Boys and girls practice the event's dances weeks before it starts. The dances performed are the Linde dance, polka and waltz. The boys also practice horse riding and the girls flaunt their colourful hand made costumes. The parish also holds the annual "Maypole celebration" on the occasion of the Austrian independence day on 10 October.
