= Međimurje horse =

Croatian horse breed

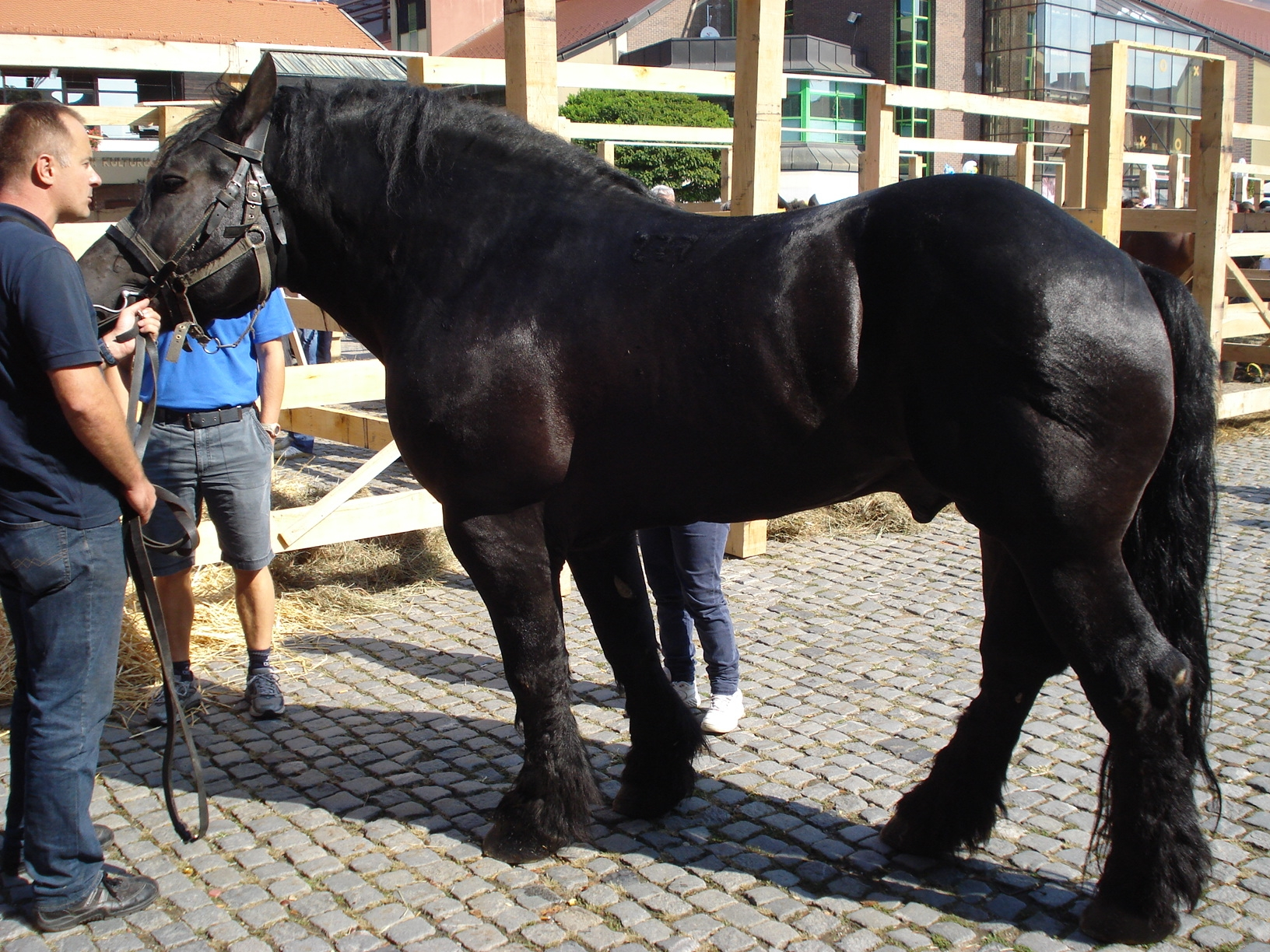
- Medjimurie horse
- Other names: Međimurec
- Country of origin: Croatia

Traits
- Distinguishing features: Medium-heavy draught horse; average height 155-165 cm

Breed standards
- [http://www.agr.unizg.hr/index_eng.htm Faculty of Agriculture Zagreb]

The Međimurje horse (pronounced [mɛdʑǐmuːriɛ]; Croatian: Međimurski konj, German: Murinsulaner, Hungarian: Muraközi ló, Slovene: Medžimurski konj) is an autochthonous medium-heavy horse breed of draught horse originating from Međimurje County in northernmost part of Croatia.

== Characteristics ==
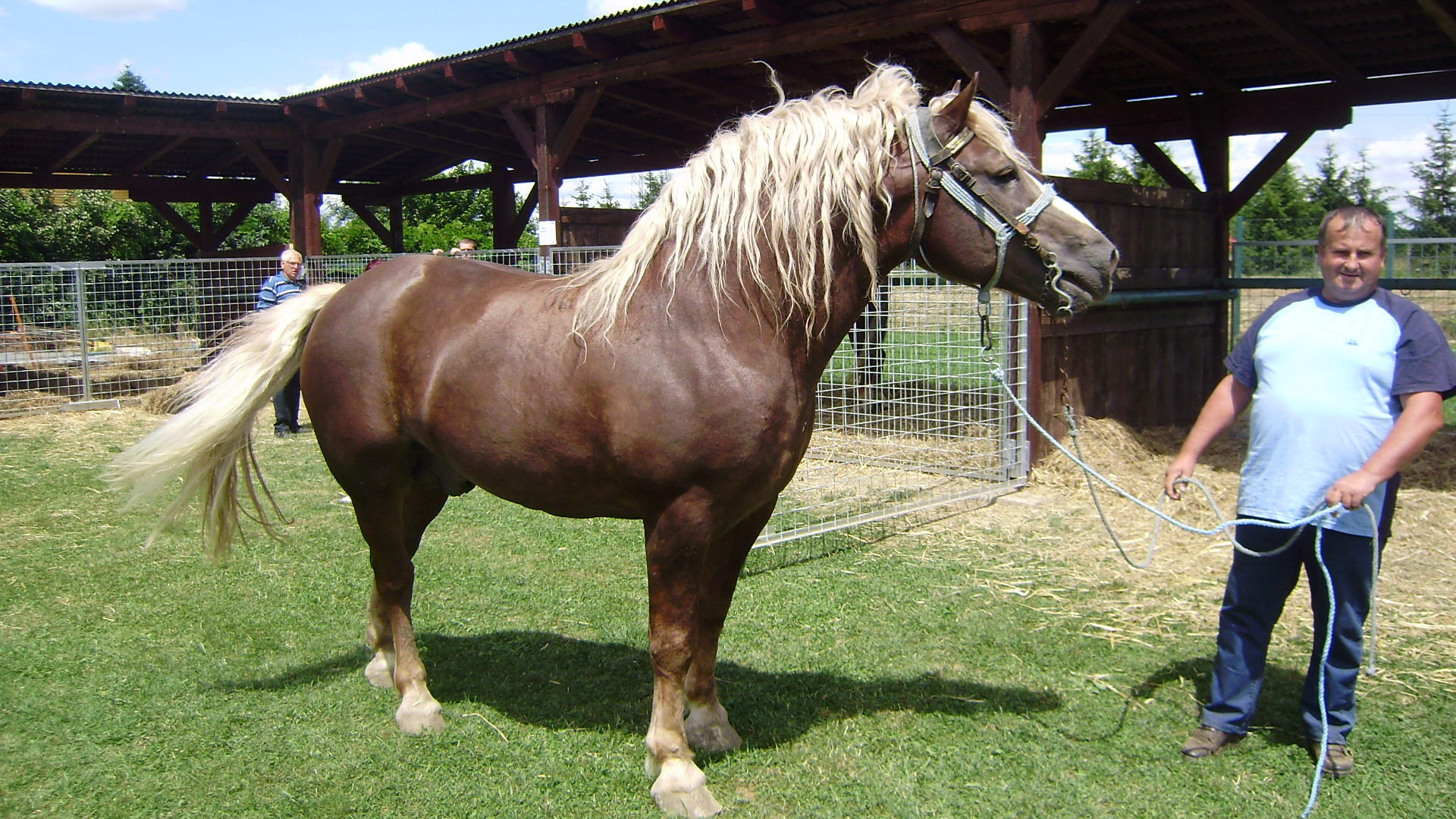
Međimurski stallion

The typical Međimurje horse ranges from 155 cm (15.1 h; 61 in) to 165 cm (16.1 h; 65 in) high. Stallions can weigh up to 900 kilograms (2,000 lb). Compared with two other cold-blooded Croatian breeds, it is significantly taller and heavier than the Posavac horse (140–150 cm high) and closer in size to the Croatian Coldblood horse (150–160 cm). It has a relatively small head and small ears, short and strong neck, pronounced withers and powerful shoulders, well-developed chest and sturdy legs.

The dominant colours are bay and seal brown, followed by black, while the other ones are much more rare.

The temperament of the Međimurje horse is calm, even and affectionate, with good obedience and willingness to work, either to pull waggons or work in a field or forest. Following the introduction of machinery into agriculture, the breed has lost its importance though, and is being used increasingly for horsemeat production today.

As for its pure-breeding, the genetical analyses were made recently, using samples of mitochondrial DNA of a significant number of both Croatian and Hungarian population of the breed, as well as related breeds (Posavac horse, Croatian Coldblood horse, Noriker horse etc.), and showed that Međimurje horse is an autochthonous breed with origin linked to some other, mostly neighbouring, cold-blooded horse breeds.

== History ==
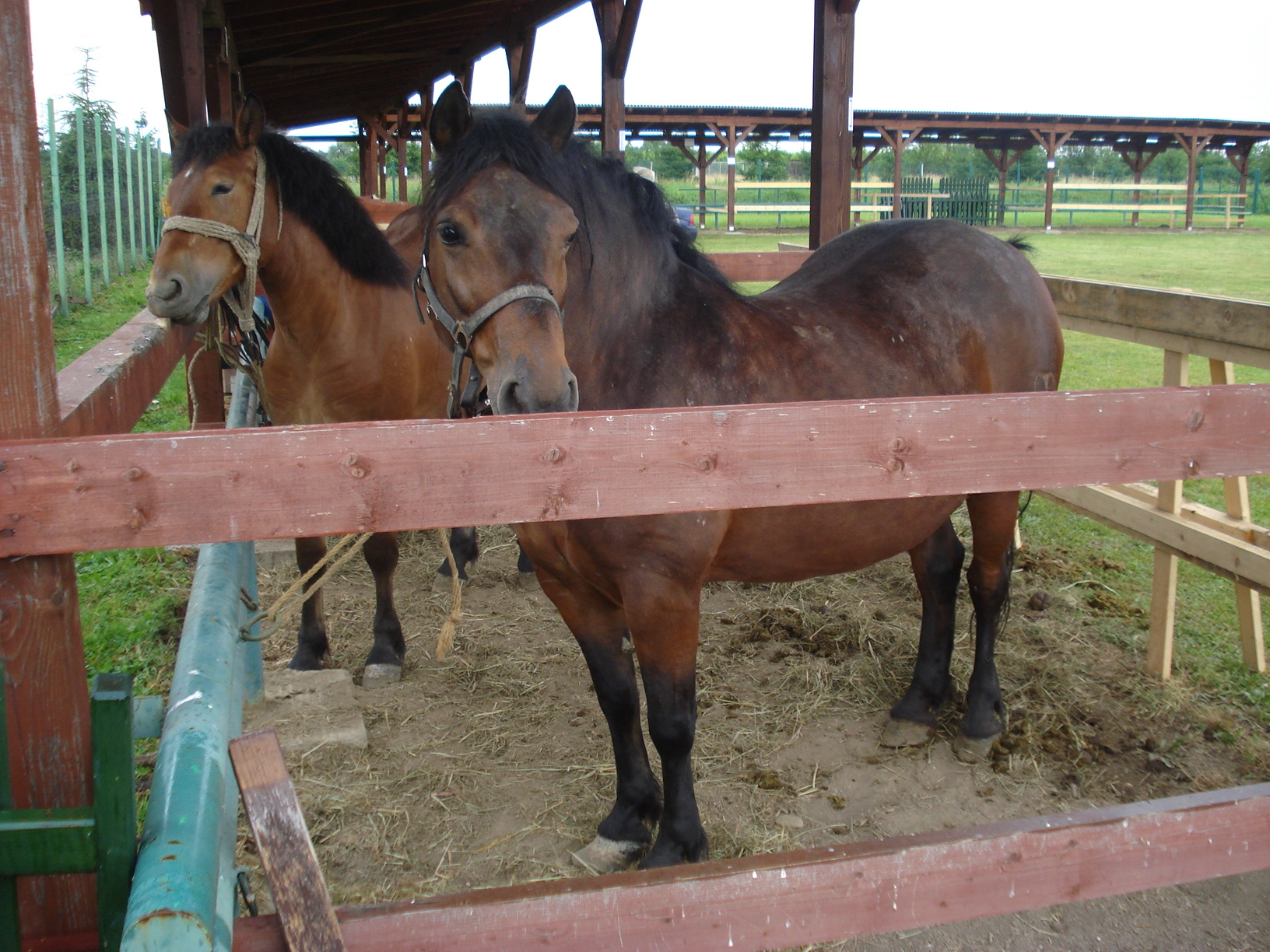
Young Međimurje mares

The beginning of the breed dates back to the end of the 18th or the beginning of the 19th century, when it was started to crossbreed native mares (having Anglo-Arabian characteristics) with imported stallions of Noriker, Ardennes, Percheron and Brabant breeds. Since Međimurje County then administratively belonged to Hungarian Zala County (during the most of 19th century, except between 1848 and 1861), international professional literature frequently quoted that the Međimurje horse descended from Hungary.

Once widely spread over parts of the Habsburg monarchy – mostly in northern Croatia (besides Međimurje, there were significant populations in Zagorje, Podravina etc.), southwestern Hungary, eastern Slovenia and eastern Austria – the breed is endangered today, with a remaining small population of only around 40 individuals in its original area in Croatia, and a larger one on the north side of the Mura River in southwestern Hungary, as well as in eastern Slovenia.

== See also ==
- Međimurje Horse Stud, Žabnik
- CUJZEK Stud
- Croatian Coldblood
- Croatian Warmblood
- Posavac horse
- List of mammals of Croatia
