= Ljutomer Trotter =

Slovenian horse breed

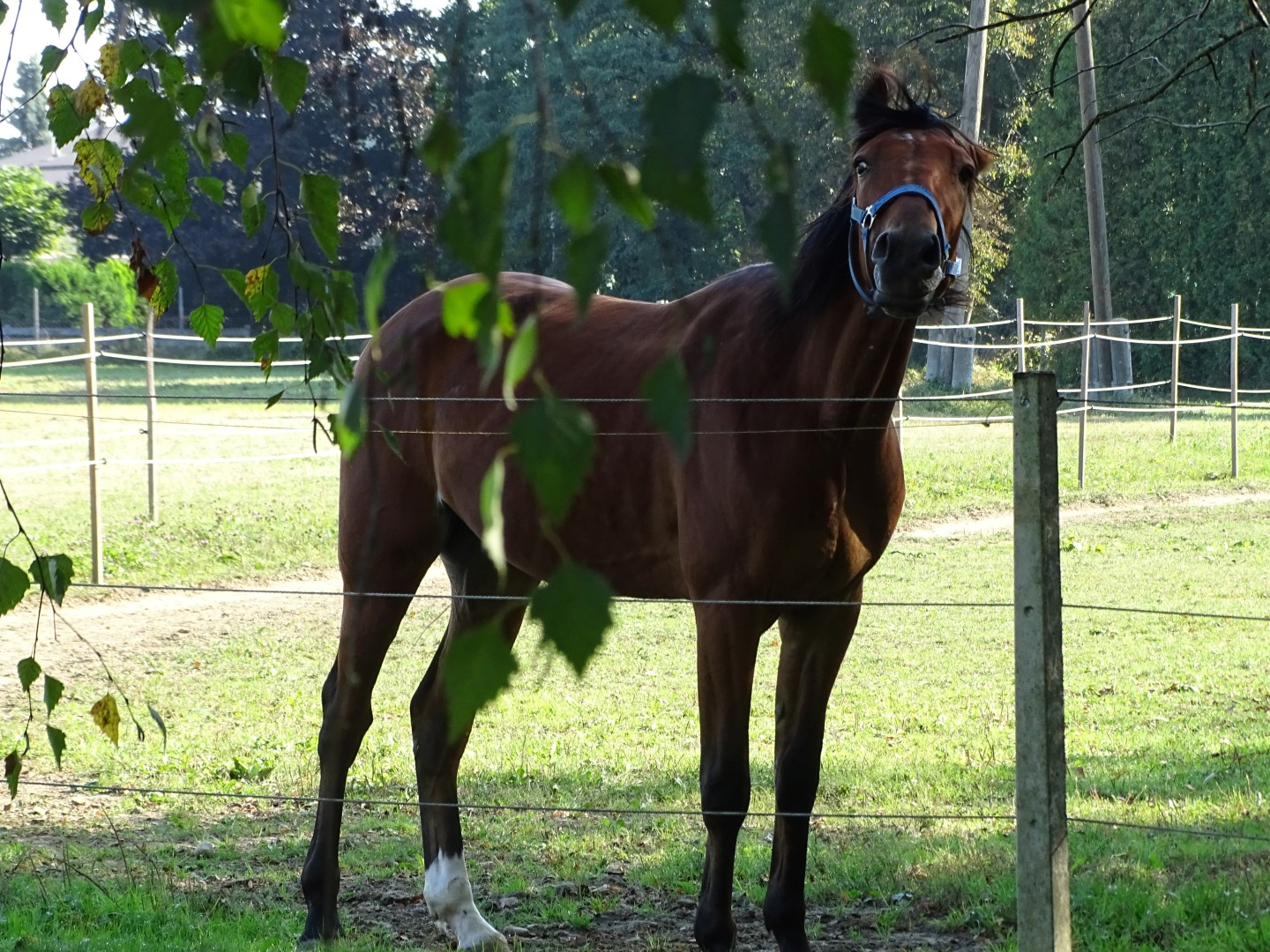
- A bay Ljutomer Trotter
- Other names: Slovene: Ljutomerski kasač
- Country of origin: Slovenia
- Standard: Breed standard for Ljutomer Trotter (in Slovenian)
- Use: riding horse

Traits
- Height: Male: 155–165 cm; Female: 150–165 cm
- Colour: mostly bay, but also other colours (expect for gray)
- Distinguishing features: medium-sized warmblood trotter, primarily racing horse

The Ljutomer Trotter (Slovene: Ljutomerski kasač) is a traditional breed of horse, originating in Slovenia in the town Ljutomer, where it was developed around year 1880. It is a breed of typical medium-sized warmbloods, with a majority of animals being bay. Until around 1960 animals were used for various farm tasks and transport, while today the breed is being reared and used primarily for sport purposes (harness racing) and recreational riding.

== Breed status ==
Presently, there are only two Slovenian traditional breeds of domestic horse, besides the Ljutomer Trotter also the Haflinger. Based on the opinion of some experts, the breed fulfills all the requirements, required for the status of Slovenian autochthonous breed of domestic animal. In some Slovenian circles there are distinct tendencies regarding the unification of all trotters of Slovenia (or even Yugoslavia) and occasionally adjective Ljutomer is being omitted and replaced with words Slovenian or Yugoslavian.

== Origin and distribution ==
Origin of this horse breed is the Slovenian town Ljutomer (cca. 1880), well known for a long period of horse breeding, also evident from Ljutomer's coat of arms of 15th century, depicting a galloping one-horned horse, surrounded with a silver shield. The systematic breeding of warmbloods, based on the multiple sources the horses of oriental origin, began in 18th century. The starter horses were the first registered autochthonous mares, proposedly in a type of Thoroughbred or Arabian horse, and in one case also the Lippizan. In that times horse breeding was highly valued by the government and horse racing was popular among aristocracy. Extremely important role in horse breeding belonged to farmers, which at first used their horses on farms and for transport. It was critical that animals were fast and able to overcome long distances, that's why owners often used their horses for racing competitions among themselves.

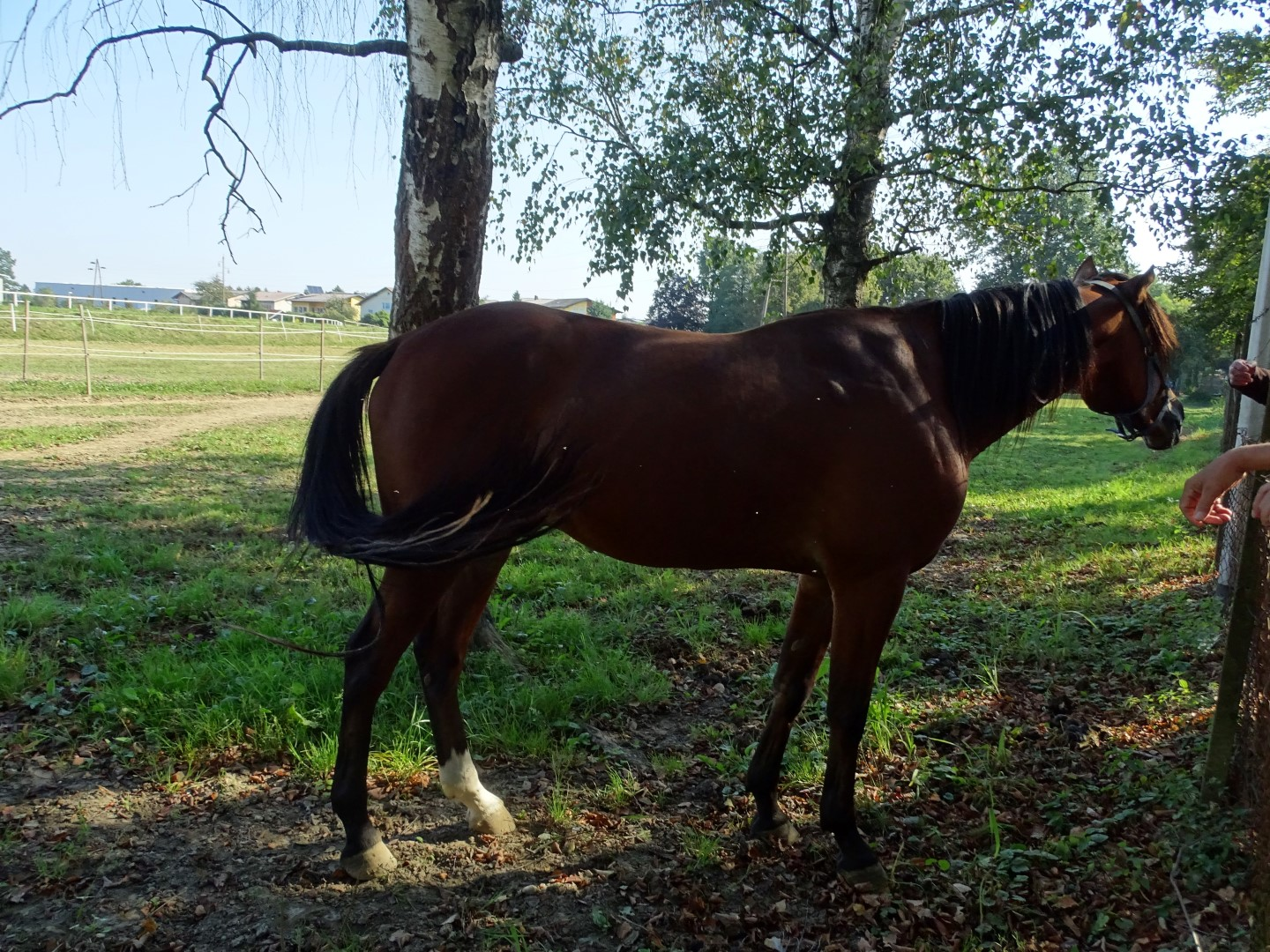
Side view

Crossbreeding the Ljutomer Trotter with foreign trotters, such as the French, Orlov, Norfolk and American, resulted in better speed performance. In year 1884 the first Norfolk Trotter Radautz, and Orlov Trotter Krolik were imported into the breeding area. Eventually crossbreeding with American Thoroughbred prevailed, but there were also some recorded attempts of pairing with other trotters, such as Orlov Trotter Hipoli and a few French Trotters. The former stud farm of trotters in Turnišče near Ptuj (active 1947–1965) greatly influenced development of the Ljutomer Trotter by importing breeding stallions into Ljutomer. The Turnišče stud farm arose from the abandoned trotter stud farm Djoko Djunderski in Kulpin, Vojvodina, and after closing in 1965 the farm was moved back to Serbia, at first to Pančevo and then to Ada.

The first organized Ljutomer horse racing competition took place in year 1874, when racing track was just a road from Križevci to Ljutomer. Quite early, in 1875, Društvo za dirkanje s kobilami v kasu was established in Ljutomer, nowadays known as the second oldest organisation of such type in Europe. The Slovenian Trotting Association, established in 1994, also got its registered seat in Ljutomer. Among successful trotters is Brown, which with time under 2 minutes improved the then record in racing. Well known is also mare Minka, which achieved time 1:39 minutes per kilometre and got itself the status of the fastest mare of Austria-Hungary.

The Ljutomer Trotter is mainly distributed in north-eastern Slovenia, with the breed's breeding centres being in Ljutomer, Maribor, Komenda, Šentjernej and Ljubljana. The population from year 2020 had around 400 horses and a stable trend. The breed is endangered because of financial shortage (rearing racing trotters is expensive), small population and a low percentage of breeding horses, as well as crossbreeding with foreign trotters (especially Thoroughbred), resulting in an influx of alien genes in the Ljutomer's gene pool.

== Features ==
=== Appearance ===
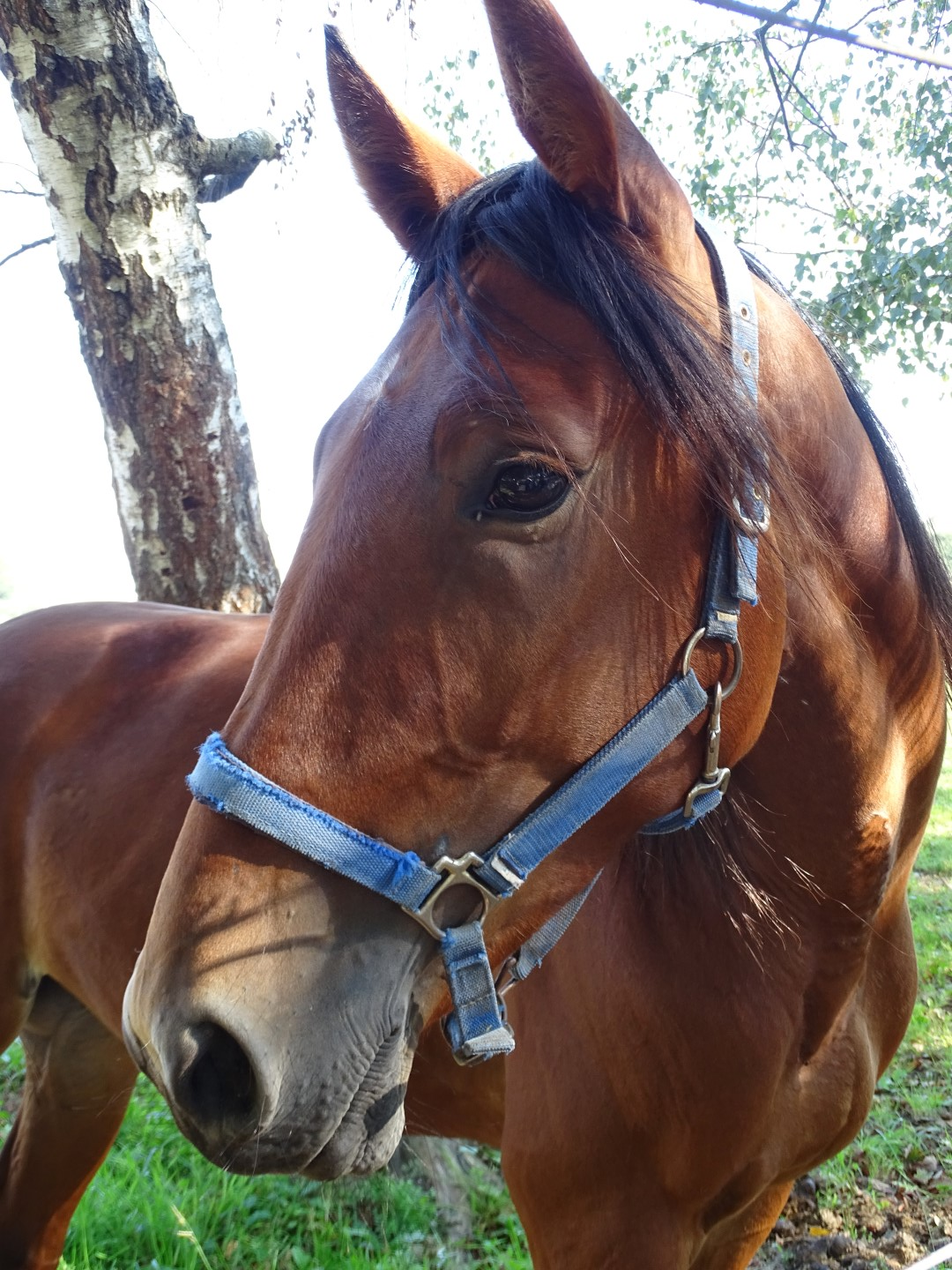
Head profile

The Ljutomer Trotter is a middle-sized warmblood (stallions around 155–165 cm and mares approximately 150–165 cm in height) of proportionate figure. Its thin head is of middle size, while a well muscled neck is medium to long. In general, a horse's trunk is long, wide and deep, withers are well pronounced, medium-sized back is flexible, long croup is wide and well muscled, while shoulders are long. A wide set of coat colours are present (expect for gray), but there are mainly bay animals. Breeders prefer horses with minimum or no depigmented (white) markings. Animals mature quite early and are (as numerous other warmbloods) of lively and benevolent character.

=== Breeding and usage ===
The stable (barn) breeding prevails, combined with grazing on pastures. Afterwards young animals and racing trotters are being reared in individual box stalls, while they also train and prepare for future competitions. Modern Ljutomer Trotters are mainly bred for shaping successful racing horses, that are able to compete when two years old. Horses, not matching the time frame and competition standards are used for recreational and tourist riding, as well as driving. Unlike historic horses, modern trotters are only rarely used as working animals.

A horse has typical characteristics of trotters; gaits are correct, even, light, energetic, abundant, as well as rational (especially in trot), meaning animals use the least amount of energy for the longest path. Animals are being taught of trot – a fast gait, where diagonal pairs of legs move forward at the same time. Some of this qualities are innate, but for becoming a quality trotter, a horse needs to start its learning process at the age of one year.

== See also ==
- List of Slovenian domestic animal breeds
