= Bosnian Mountain Horse =

Breed of horse

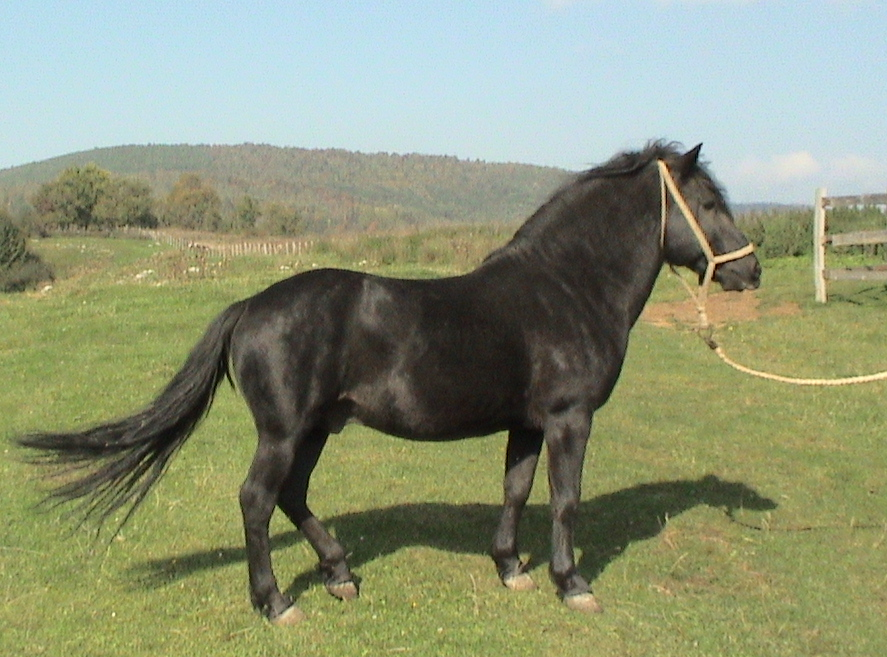
- Conservation status: FAO (2007): not at risk; DAD-IS (2023): at risk
- Other names: Bosnian: Bosanski brdski konj; Босански брдски коњ; Glasinački; Podveleški; Bosnian Pony; Bosniak
- Country of origin: Bosnia and Herzegovina

Traits
- Weight: Male: 300 kg; Female: 250 kg
- Height: 130 cm

The Bosnian Mountain Horse (Bosnian: Bosanski brdski konj / Босански брдски коњ) is the only indigenous breed of domestic horse in Bosnia and Herzegovina, where it constitutes about 70% of the horse population. It is a small horse and is used both as a pack animal and for riding. Breed numbers were severely reduced during the Bosnian War of 1992–1995, and, unlike populations of other farm animals, continued to fall after the end of the war.

== History ==
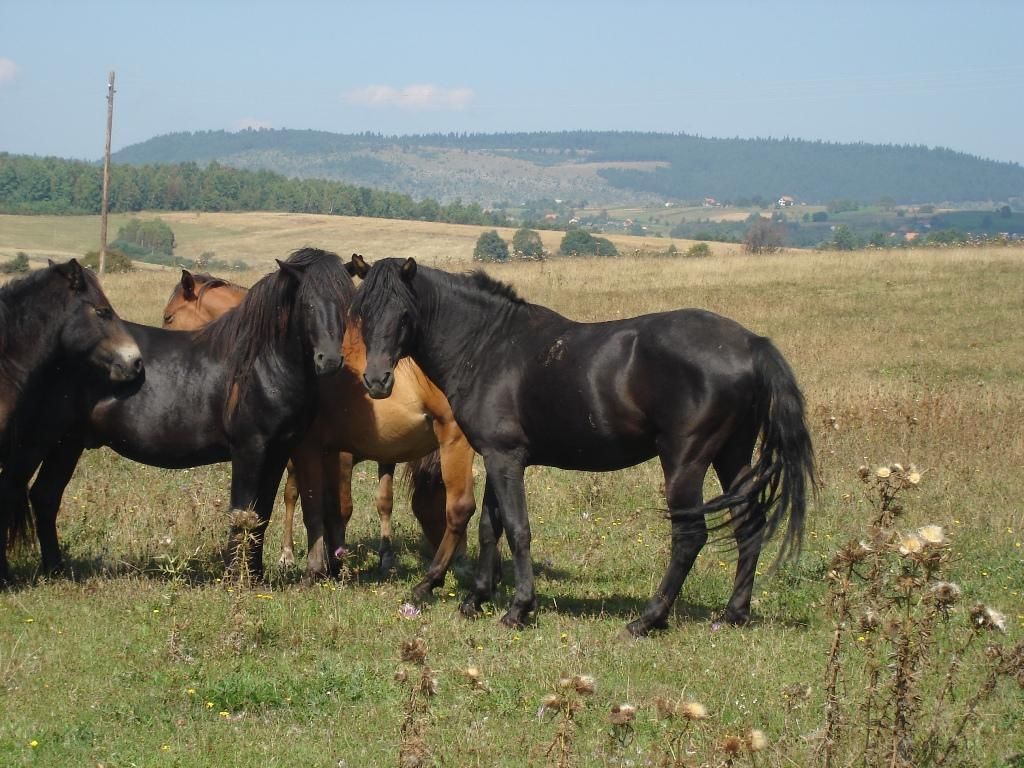
At the Borike state stud

Selective breeding of the Bosnian Mountain Horse began at the stud of Goražde in 1908. The principal centres for the selection of the breed were the stud farms of Borike, in the municipality of Rogatica, and Han Pijesak. Three stallion lines – Agan, Barut and Miško – and nine mare lines were established; the Agan line is lost, and the Barut and Miško lines heavily mixed. Arab stallions at the Borike stud were used to improve the Bosnian Mountain Horse.

There are two types within the breed. The Glasinacki type has substantial Arab influence; it is named after the plateau of Glasinac on the Romanija mountain, in the eastern part of the Republika Srpska. A smaller type, the Podveleški, is found in Herzegovina.

Horse populations – like those of other farm animals – suffered heavily during the Bosnian War of 1992–1995. In the Federation of Bosnia and Herzegovina, the total number of horses fell from 46628 in 1990 to 16080 in 1995, and by 2002 had fallen further to 7014, or about 15% of the pre-war number; in the Republika Srpska numbers also fell, though not so steeply. Overall, horse numbers in Bosnia and Herzegovina fell by 68% between 1990 and 2002.

The breed has not been substantially affected by importations of foreign horses. It is in some areas the principal, or even the only, means of transportation.

== Characteristics ==
A survey of 3800 of the horses in the 1950s found the commonest colour to be bay, accounting for 38% of the total, followed by grey (28%), black (18%), chestnut (13%), dun and striped dun (3%) and isabelline (0.13%).
