= Croatian Warmblood =

Type of horse

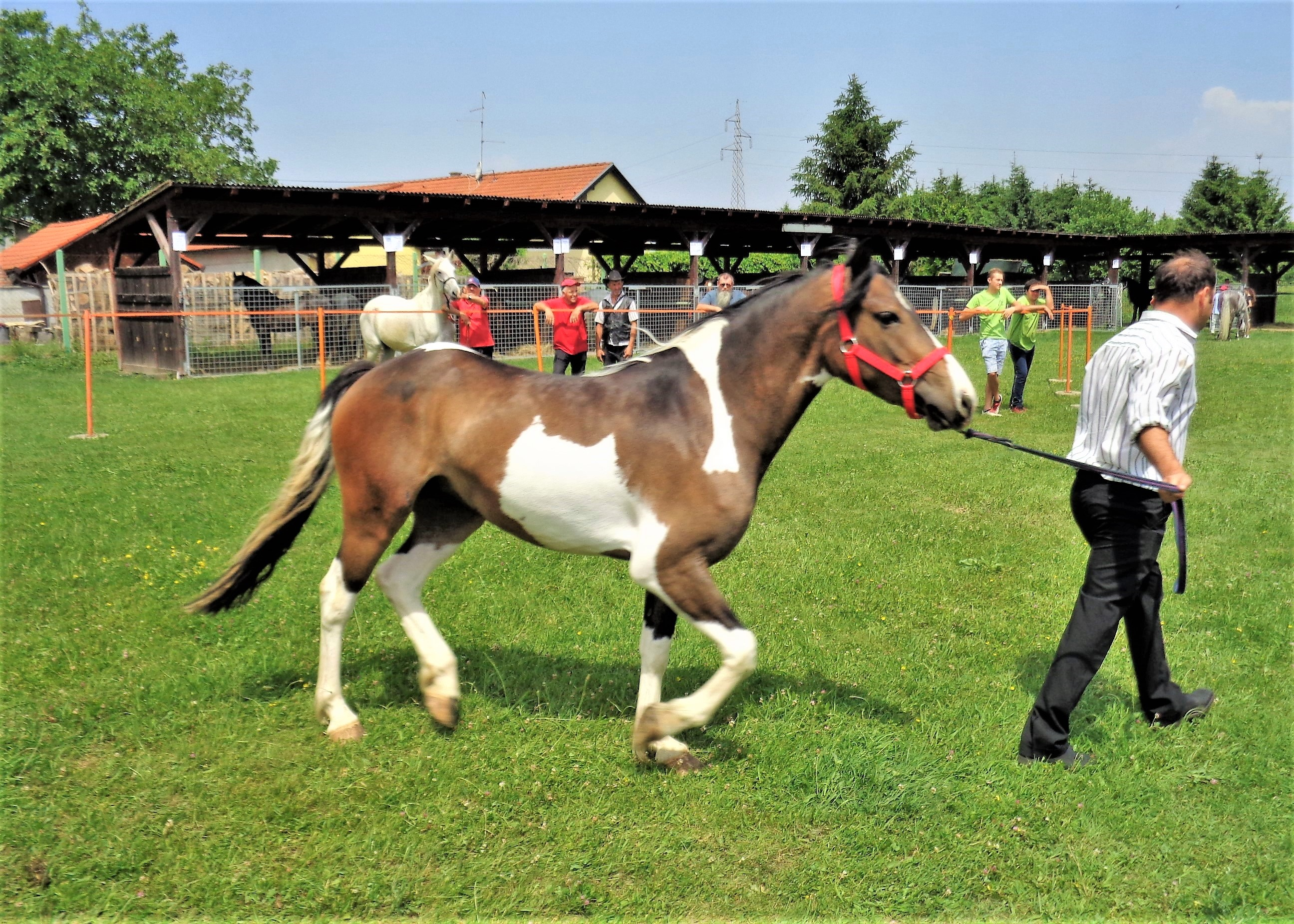
- spotted bay coloured Croatian Warmblood at 2019 MESAP Trade Fair in Nedelišće, Croatia
- Other names: Hrvatski toplokrvnjak
- Country of origin: Croatia

Traits
- Distinguishing features: Medium-heavy built horse with well-proportioned appearance

Breed standards
- [http://www.agr.unizg.hr/index_eng.htm Faculty of Agriculture Zagreb]

Croatian Warmblood (Croatian: Hrvatski toplokrvnjak) is a warmblood type of horse originating in Croatia. It is a new type of middle-weight warmblood horses created at the end of the 20th century and officially recognized in 1998, bred as a utility crossbred obtained by crossing purebred tournament horses, used mainly for equestrian sport (dressage, show jumping, trail riding etc.) and carriage driving.

== History ==
The Croatian Warmblood is one of the most numerous warmblood horses in Croatia with 510 officially registered heads in 2024. The uniqueness of the Croatian Warmblood is that it was created by crossing horses from the own breeding with German warmblood breeds. The systematic breeding process began mostly in the northwestern parts of Croatia in the 1990s and the breeding types are still in the formative stage. The largest number of Warmbloods is found in the counties of Bjelovar-Bilogora, Koprivnica-Križevci and Zagreb County as well as in the area of the City of Zagreb.

The number of Croatian Warmblood horses indicates that they are among the most widespread breeds and breeding types in the country. The Miscellany published on the occasion of the 1st Conference of Horse Breeders in the Republic of Croatia held in 2014 states that the most numerous breeds are the Croatian Coldblood (6,614 heads), the Croatian Posavina Horse (Posavac) (5,131), the Lipizzaner (2,166), the Pony (799) and then the Croatian Warmblood with 639 heads.

== Characteristics ==
The Croatian Warmblood is a breeding type of horse which is influenced by genetic input of other warmblood breeding types. It combines various characteristics of both thoroughbreds and draft horses, with a balance in many respects: faster than a draft horse, inferior to thoroughbred racehorses (especially over long distance), also somewhat heavier than the thoroughbred, but not as massive as the draft horse.

Its conformation is elegant and harmonious.Typical height measured at the withers can vary, similarly to the others warmbloods, mostly from about 160 to 170 centimeters. Another characteristic is its straight and distinctive head with a thick, long mane, as well as a high-set tail that gives a proud appearance.

== See also ==
- List of horse breeds
- Economy of Croatia
- Tourism in Croatia
