= Noriker =

Austrian/Italian breed of horse

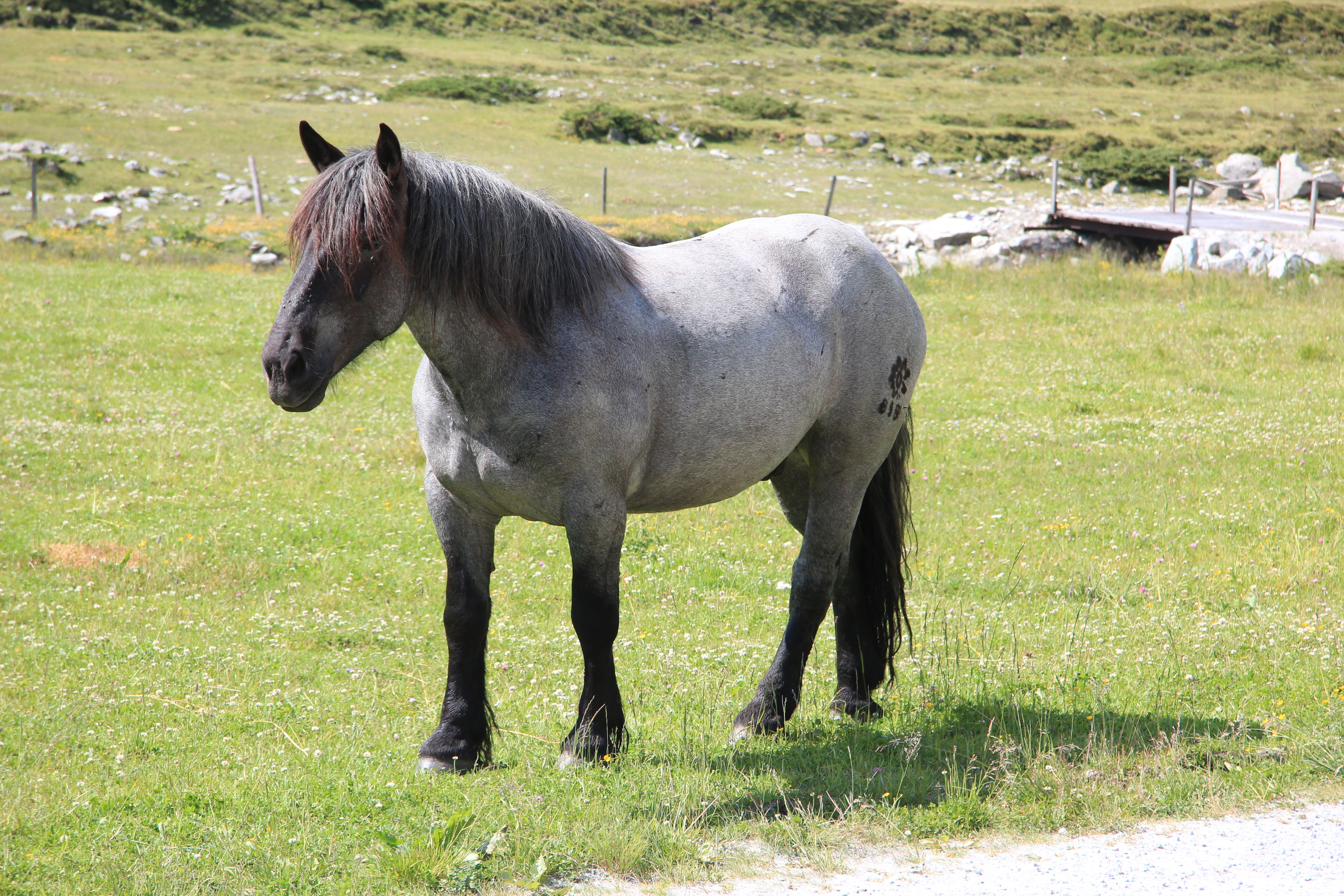
- Noriker stallion with official edelweiss brand
- Other names: Pinzgauer, Norico-Pinzgauer
- Country of origin: Austria

Traits
- Distinguishing features: Agile, sure-footed draft horse of medium height

Breed standards
- Zentrale Arbeitsgemeinschaft Österreichischer Pferdezüchter; Associazione Italiana Allevatori

The Noriker horse, also called the Norico-Pinzgauer and historically known as the Pinzgauer horse, is a moderately heavy Austrian draught horse breed. The Noriker is considered indigenous to the central Alpine region of Europe, and is believed to have originated around the highest mountain of Austria, the Grossglockner. This region was once known as the Roman province of Noricum. At the end of the 19th century the original name Pinzgauer horse was changed to Noriker horse, due in part to the Romanophile attitude in this time.

The breed played an important role in the transportation of goods through the Alps, carrying salt, gold and Celtic iron from Salzburg to Italy, and on the return journey bringing back wine and spices. This use developed a powerful, long, deep-barreled and sure-footed draught horse as an adaptation to the alpine terrain. The use of Noriker horses in agriculture started much later, during the industrialisation period in the 20th century.

== Characteristics ==
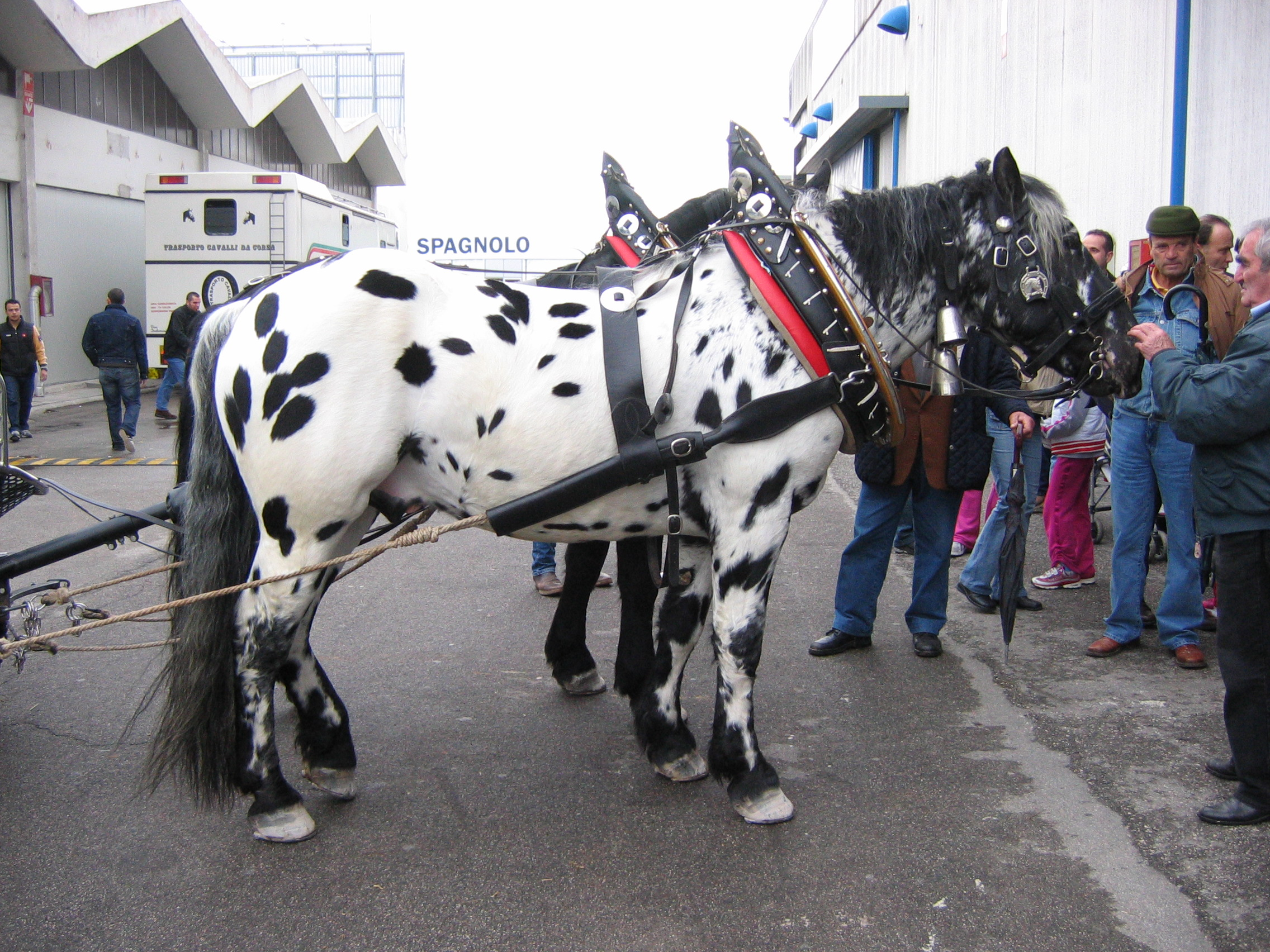
A spotted "tiger" Noriker horse at Fieracavalli, Verona

The Noriker is a moderately heavy mountain draught horse with a low centre of gravity, sure-footed, and with a good sense of balance. The height at the withers lies between 158 and 163 cm (15.2 and 16.0 hands). The head should be dry, typy and should express draught horse characteristics. The neck is strong with visible musculature. The shoulder should be long and well positioned. The width of chest is broad and deep, the croup is very muscular. Special attention is placed on correct position of the short legs having strong clean joints and little feathering. Circumference of cannon bones of mares has to be between 22 and 25 centimetres (8.7 and 9.8 in).

Norikers present in several colors: bay, black, chestnut, roan (called Mohrenköpfe), leopard (tigrato in Italian and tigerschecken in German) and, rarely, tobiano. The latter three originate from the Schloss Rif stud.

== Breed history ==
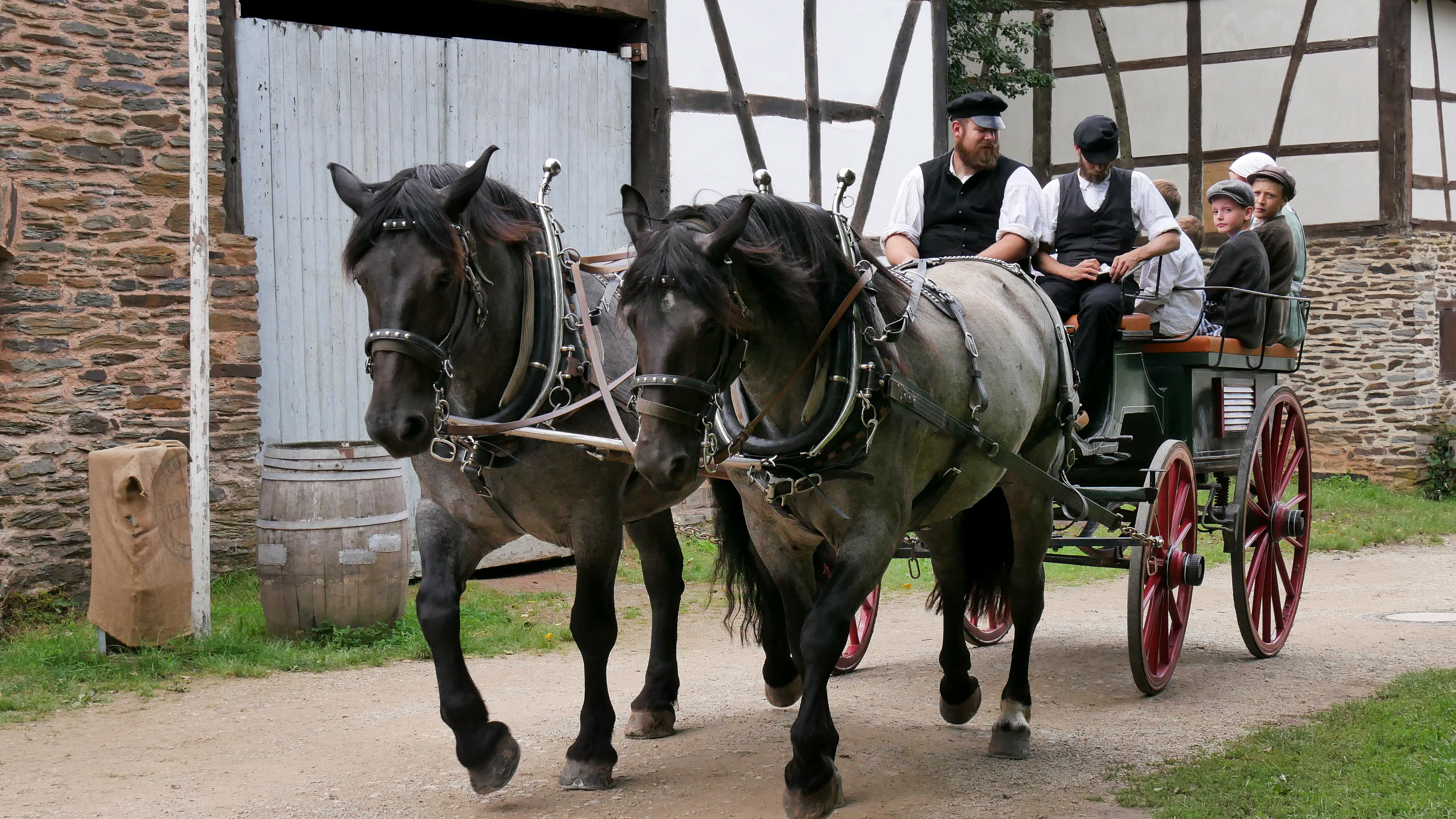
Harnessed pair at the Freilichtmuseum Roscheider Hof in Konz, in Germany

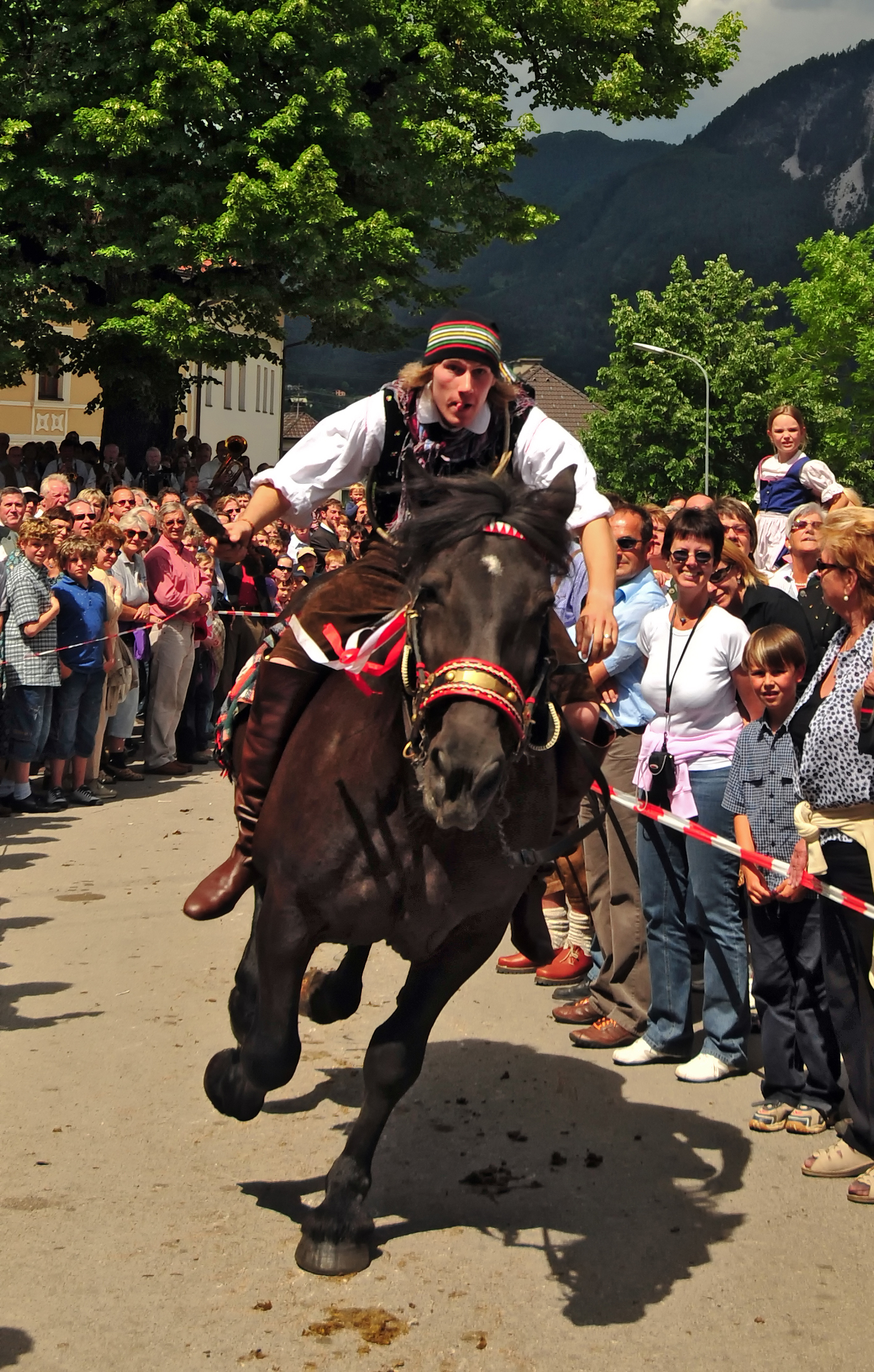
The Noriker horse is ridden in the Kufenstechen, part of a traditional folk event in Feistritz an der Gail during the annual Kermesse on Whit Monday, wherein unmarried young men attempt to smash a wooden barrel with an iron

Up to the end of the 19th century, Noriker horses were an important link in the trade between central Europe and the Adriatic.

With the establishment of the stud farm at Schloss Rif, near Salzburg in 1565, the phase of the refinement by Neapolitan and Iberian stallions began, which exerted their influence on the Noriker horse until 1806. Down to the present day this influence is visible in the conformation of these horses: Roman heads with a powerful and compact topline, long manes and tails, and a large number of black horses as well as blue roans, called Mohrenkopf referring directly to the Italian expression testa di moro or capo moro, meaning "dark head" or "Moor (dark) head". Besides Mohrenköpfen, the leopard spotted coat colour, named tiger, is still an active breeding objective of the breed, which is unusual for nearly all other European horse breeds.

In 1903, the studbook was closed, and since then Noriker horses are strictly purebred. The Italian stud book was established in 2011, but because Noriker is a cross-border breed and Austria holds the original stud book, the AIA defers to the Austrian rules of selection.

The years between the two world wars were when the popularity of the Noriker horse peaked, and the population grew constantly. However, after the Second World War, mechanisation started to take over, though in the poorer mountainous regions of Austria the machinery was not affordable, so horses in the Alps have continued to be part of everyday life until about 1968, when the Noriker horse population, then at 34,510 head, began to decline.

The late 1970s were called the crisis of horse breeding in Europe, and within about twenty years, 80% of the Noriker horses disappeared, a fact that was directly connected to the third wave of mechanisation. By 1985, only 6,996 Noriker horses survived. While today, many draught horse breeds of Europe are endangered, the Noriker has rebounded to some extent, and currently about 10,000 Noriker horses are living in the Austrian countryside. The Noriker is also bred in Italy, predominantly in the Puster Valley and the Ladin valleys. The Noriker is considered an indigenous horse breed recognised by the Associazione Italiana Allevatori (AIA), the Italian breeders' association, which also publishes the Italian breed standard. The regional breeders' federation is the same as that for the Haflinger, the Provincial Federation of South Tyrol Haflinger Horse Breeders.

=== The Abtenauer ===
A smaller sub-type of the Noriker, standing about 147–152 centimetres (14.2–15.0 hands; 58–60 in), was reared in the area of Abtenau, in the Lammertal to the south of Salzburg. Unlike the main population, this Abtenauer strain did not carry the leopard-spotting gene; the most usual colours were chestnut, black and blue roan. It had quality gaits and was noted as a good trotter. The breed's primary use was to transport wood over steep terrain. It was absorbed into the main Noriker population.

== Founding sire lines ==
There are five sire lines: Vulkan, Nero, Schaunitz, Diamant, and Elmar. Male foals are named with a double name—the first name starting with the same first letter as their sire, the second name is the foundation sire's name, followed by a roman numeral indicating the number of generations since the founding sire. Female foals are named starting with the same letter as their dam.
