= Slovene Late-feathered Hen =

Slovenian chicken breed

- Other names: Slovenian Late Feathering Hen; Slovenian Late Feathered Hen; Slovenian Slow Feathering Hen; Slovene: Slovenska pozno operjena kokoš
- Country of origin: Slovenia
- Use: Broilers, rarely eggs

Traits
- Weight: Male: 4.3–4.7 kg; Female: 2.8–3.2 kg
- Skin color: Yellow
- Egg color: Light brown
- Comb type: Single

Classification

Notes
- Used for obtaining commercial crossbreeds
- Chicken; Gallus gallus domesticus

Slovene Late-feathered Hen (Slovene: Slovenska pozno operjena kokoš) is a traditional breed of domestic chicken, originating in Slovenia. The breed is categorised as a heavy or meat type, and is consequently used for raising broilers. As of year 2013, when two heavy breeds Slovene Early-feathered Hen and Slovenian Fathering Hen were removed from the list, it is the only meat type chicken breed among Slovenian traditional breeds of domestic animals. The Slovene Late-feathered Hen is characterised by animals covered with white plumage and known for slow feathering speed.

== History and distribution ==
The breed was derived from the foreign American breed the White Plymouth Rock, that was imported in great numbers on farm Neverke pri Pivki around year 1960. The formation of the breed is thought to have also included birds of other selections. Gradual shaping of the Slovene Late-feathered Hen began on the Research station Rodica; animals with slow feathering speed were primarily selected for. Such hens were used for establishment of the original animal line, that was later on distributed by pairing purebred chickens and at the same time performing the selection. Nowadays the breed is bred mostly on the Department of Zootechnics of the Biotechnical Faculty of University of Ljubljana. In year 2020 there were 340 animals of the Slovene Late-feathered Hen, with trend slowly increasing, even though back in year 2006 only a few less hens were counted, around 320.

== Features ==
=== Appearance ===
Hens of the Slovene Late-feathered Chicken are covered with white plumage (without any special patterns), which is a common characteristic of broilers, since cadavers of such animals are neater (hens with colourful feathers retain dark coloured calami on their skin). Speed of feathering is slow; pairing a slow feathering hen with a rooster that feathers early, results in the so-called autosex offspring, which can be sexed based on speed of the feathering. Animals have wide and well developed back and breasts. On the top of a chicken's head is simple (and single), red and middle sized comb, eyes are yellow, and on the lower part of the head are small, red coloured earlobes. The Slovene Late-feathered Hen has yellowish legs, as well as yellow coloured skin. In average, roosters reach 4.5 kg (4.3–4.7 kg) of body mass, while hens are a little lighter with their average 3.0 kg (2.8–3.2 kg). Animals reach their sexual maturity (laying of their first egg) after living for around 24 to 25 weeks.

=== Breeding and usage ===
The Slovene Late-feathered Hen is intended for different breeding modes of intensive farming; at the beginning hens are based in classical coups, that are being periodically illuminated, following the predetermined programme. When animals reach 16 weeks of age, breeders usually move them to different modes of breeding. A part of the flock is being raised within battery farms, with animals living inside enriched (battery) cages. Some birds are bred on combined farms, with hens living both on litter and lattice, while remaining chickens are a part of typical barn breeding with free-run chickens. The breed is also suitable for ecological farming technologies.

Birds are classified among heavy or meat breeds, primarily used for breeding broilers and acquiring chicken meat. Less intensively hens of the Slovenian Late-feathered breed are used as layers, that lay bright brown eggs. In average such layer hen produces around 200 eggs per year, with each egg weighing 60 g. This Slovenian traditional chicken is also important for obtaining heavy commercial hybrid of the trademark Prelux, named Prelux-BRO, which is a result of pairing multiple breeds. In this case the Slovene Late-feathered Hen plays a role of a grandparent father breed for producing mothers of Prelux-BRO (a rooster of the Slovene Late-feathered Hen is crossed with a hen of the Slovene Early-feathered Hen, then female offspring is paired with roosters of the Slovenian Fathering Hen, resulting in hatching of the Prelux-BRO).

== See also ==
- List of Slovenian domestic animal breeds
