= Slovenian Silver Hen =

Chicken breed

- Other names: Slovene: Slovenska srebrna kokoš
- Country of origin: Slovenia
- Use: Primarily eggs

Traits
- Weight: Male: 2.7–3.2 kg; Female: 2.2–2.4 kg
- Skin color: Yellow
- Egg color: Brown
- Comb type: Single

Classification

Notes
- Used as a parent breed for obtaining commercial crossbreeds
- Chicken; Gallus gallus domesticus

Slovenian Silver Hen (Slovene: Slovenska srebrna kokoš) is a traditional breed of domestic chicken, originating in Slovenia. The breed, that was developed some centuries ago on the Biotechnical Faculty of University of Ljubljana, is characterised by typical white coloured layer hens, used primarily for production of commercial crossbreeds sold under the trademark Prelux.

== History and distribution ==
The end of the 20th century is usually considered as this young breed's beginning, more specifically seventies, when experts from the Department of Animal Science of Biotechnical Faculty of Ljubljana started developing multiple Slovenian traditional chicken breeds. The Slovenian Silver Hen was consolidated and tested in year 1968. There are thought to be many starter breeds used for developing the Slovenian Silver. When selecting commercial crossbreeds the sex linked gene that codes for a typical white (silver) colour of plumage was preferred and selected for.

Since hens of the breed are less interesting for breeding in bigger industrial-like complexes, animals are mostly bred and selected for on the PRC for Poultry Breeding of Biotechnical Faculty of Ljubljana. In year 2020 there were more than 900 animals of the Slovenian Silver with ascending population's trend.

== Features ==
=== Appearance ===
Animals of the breed are layer hens. Typical animals of the Slovenian Silver weigh 2.7–3.2 kg in roosters and 2.2–2.4 kg in hens, meaning they are heavier than members of the Slovenian Brown Hen and lighter than individuals of the Slovenian Barred Hen. Hens are covered with white coloured plumage and there is no visible special pattern. A single and simple comb reaches middle sizes and is usually set upright or partly downcast. On an animal's head are yellow-orange eyes and small earlobes that are light red and covered with white blotches. Legs are of yellow colour. Hens usually reach their sexual maturity after achieving 20–21 weeks of age.

=== Breeding and usage ===
Hens, intended for different modes of intensive farming, are being reared in periodically illuminated coups. Pullets that reach 16 weeks are transferred to a one of possible breeding programmes. Some are being bred within battery farms, with hens living inside enriched (battery) cages. Other animals are either a part of combined breeding with hens being partly on litter and partly on lattice either a part of typical barn breeding with free-run chickens.

Hens of the Slovenian Silver are layer hens that lay brown coloured quality eggs in average weighing around 64 grams. The breed's edible eggs are known for a quality albumen (egg white) and mass that exceeds mass of eggs belonging to Slovenian Barred and Slovenian Brown. An average hen lays around 260–270 eggs per year. Besides being a breed of layer hens the Slovenian Silver is also important as a parent breed for Slovenian commercial chickens, sold under the name Prelux. Such commercial crossbreeds are known for their improved egg laying abilities. The so-called Prelux-R (prelux rjava in Slovenian, Prelux Brown in English) is a result of pairing hens of Slovenian Silver and roosters of Slovenian Brown.

== See also ==
- Slovenian Barred Hen
- Slovenian Brown Hen
- List of Slovenian domestic animal breeds
