= Slovenian Barred Hen =

Chicken breed

- Other names: Slovene: Slovenska grahasta kokoš
- Country of origin: Slovenia
- Use: Primarily eggs

Traits
- Weight: Male: 3.0–3.5 kg; Female: 2.3–2.7 kg
- Skin color: Yellow
- Egg color: Light brown
- Comb type: Single

Classification

Notes
- Used as a parent breed for obtaining commercial crossbreeds
- Chicken; Gallus gallus domesticus

Slovenian Barred Hen (Slovene: Slovenska grahasta kokoš) is a traditional breed of domestic chicken, originating in Slovenia. This breed was developed on the Biotechnical Faculty of University of Ljubljana some decades ago. Animals of the Slovenian Barred Hen are barred black and white layer hens, used primarily for production of commercial crossbreeds sold under the trademark Prelux.

== History and distribution ==
It is a relatively young Slovenian traditional breed of domestic chicken, originating in 1970, when experts from the Department of Animal Science of Biotechnical Faculty of Ljubljana started developing it. Foreign chicken breeds Barred Plymouth Rock and White Plymouth Rock are considered as its starter breeds. Breeders were selecting for a proper body mass and a better ability of egg-laying, at the same time the barred pattern of plumage was also of a great importance.

Since hens are not suitable for breeding in big commercial complexes, the breed is still being bred and selected for mostly on the PRC for Poultry Breeding of Biotechnical Faculty of Ljubljana. There are thought to be around 1270 birds of the breed in Slovenia (data from 2020), with their number increasing.

== Features ==
=== Appearance ===
Animals of this breed are layer hens. Slovenian Barred Hen is heavier than hens of other Slovenian traditional layer hens, roosters are weighing 3.0–3.5 kg, while hens are a bit lighter with their 2.3–2.7 kg. Their plumage is of a barred pattern, with alternating black and white colour, and roosters being lighter than hens. A simple and single leaf-like comb is of middle sizes, hens have small red earlobes and orange eyes. Legs are of light yellow colour, while their toes are covered with darker tones that are more pronounced in females. Hens reach their sexual maturity after living for approximately 20–21 weeks.

=== Breeding and usage ===
Slovenian Barred Hens are being bred in different modes of intensive farming; often animals are reared in bigger coups that are being periodically illuminated. When reaching 16 weeks of age, pullets (young hens) are moved to various possible breeding programmes. Some animals are being breed on battery farms, where they live in enriched (battery) cages. Other animals are either a part of combined breeding with hens being partly on litter and partly on lattice, or a part of typical barn breeding with free-run chickens.

Chickens of the Slovenian Barred breed are layer hens, that lay quality eggs of light brown colour and average weight of 59 grams. Usually these hens lay from 240 to 250 eggs per year. The breed is also important as a parent breed of Slovenian commercial crossbreeds that are being sold under the brand name Prelux. Such crossbreeds are usually better layer hens. The commercial crossbreed named Prelux-Č (prelux črna in Slovenian, Prelux Black in English) is a descendant of hens of Slovenian Barred Hen and roosters of Slovenian Brown Hen. The so-called Prelux-G (prelux grahasta in Slovenian, Prelux Barred in English) is a result of crossbreeding a rooster of Slovenian Barred Hen and a hen of Slovenian Brown Hen. Young castrated roosters – capons are useful as a source of meat often treated as a delicacy.

== See also ==
- Slovenian Brown Hen
- Slovenian Silver Hen
- List of Slovenian domestic animal breeds
