= Prelux =

Slovenian commercial crossbreed chicken

- Other names: Types: Prelux-Č, Prelux-G, Prelux-R, Prelux-BRO
- Country of origin: Slovenia
- Use: Eggs (Prelux-Č, Prelux-G and Prelux-R); Meat (Prelux-BRO, Prelux-G)

Traits
- Egg color: Brown
- Comb type: Single

Classification

Notes
- Commercial crossbreed

Prelux are commercial chicken crossbreeds of the Slovenian origin, that are being sold under the eponymous trademark by the Biotechnical Faculty of University of Ljubljana. The name is an abbreviation for the Slovenian phrase prevojski luxuriranci, with a word luxuriranci referring to luxuriance (heterosis) or outbreeding enhancement of hybrid offspring, and adjective prevojski referring to the Slovenian settlement Prevoje, where selective breeding was once performed. This name was given to quality layer hens, that are being obtained by crossbreeding three Slovenian traditional breeds of layer hens; Slovenian Barred, Slovenian Brown and Slovenian Silver Hen. The most known and best-selling layer hens of the trademark Prelux are Prelux-Č, Prelux-G and Prelux-R. A part of the selection is also a meat type chicken (broiler), Prelux-BRO.

== Breeding ==
Obtaining Prelux chickens
Type	Hen (parent 1)	Rooster (parent 2)
px-Č	SGK	SRK
px-G	SRK	SGK
px-R	SSK	SRK

Commercial chickens of the trademark Prelux are being selected, grown and then sold further to mostly Slovenian customers on the PRC for Poultry Breeding of Department of Animal Science, Biotechnical Faculty of Ljubljana. Prelux chickens are two-breed hybrids, obtained from a parent flock of three Slovenian traditional breeds; Slovenian Barred, Slovenian Brown and Slovenian Silver. Those three breeds are being crossbred in various combinations, depending on a parent's breed and sex. The meat type Prelux, which is a hybrid of multiple different breeds, is a result of crossbreeding Slovenian heavier breeds in a special sequence. Prelux chickens are usually not meant for further reproduction, since such hybrids do not pass plumage colouration to their offspring, which are consequently covered with feathers of various shades.

=== Importance ===
Nowadays poultry breeders more often use commercial crossbred chickens instead of purebred and original chicken breeds. These animals are either crossbreeds of different purebred breeds either line crossbreeds – a result of pairing different chicken lines (homogeneous groups inside breeds). Commercial chickens are popular because of their usability; often they have a higher production yield, and it is relatively easy to breed them in different modes of intensive farming (including free-run, free-range and enriched (battery) cages, as well as other alternative modes). Feature of Slovenian Prelux layer hens are also autosex chicks, that enable any breeder to determine animal's biological sex at the age of just one day. Autosex chicks have sex-dependant plumage colouration or different feathering speed.

== Types ==
The selection of Prelux chicken types includes the most widespread layer hens Prelux-Č, Prelux-G, Prelux-R and slightly less common Prelux-M. A part of the Prelux selection is also a chicken of heavy or meat type, broiler Prelux-BRO.

=== Prelux-Č ===
Prelux-Č (prelux črna and črni prelux in Slovenian, Prelux Black and Black Prelux in English) is a type of commercial layer crossbreed. It is a hybrid between a hen of the Slovenian Barred Hen and a rooster of the Slovenian Brown Hen. Animals of the Black Pelux have shiny black plumage with shades of brown on their neck. When hatched, female chicks are totally black, while male chicks have a white stripe on their head. Morphological and production features of Prelux-Č are similar to those of Prelux-G. Hens measured in 18th week reached a body mass of 1.8 kg, and after one year of laying the value increased to 2.4 kg. In average, the Black Prelux, grown in battery cage, lays 314 eggs per year, with a single egg weighing 64 g.

=== Prelux-G ===
Prelux-G (prelux grahasta and grahasti prelux in Slovenian, Prelux Barred and Barred Prelux in English) is a type of commercial layer crossbreed. This hybrid is a result of pairing the same traditional breeds as in Prelux-Č, the only difference is a swapped role of parent breeds; a hen is of the Slovenian Brown and a rooster is of the Slovenian Barred. Feather colouration of this type resembles Slovenian Barred Hen, as Barred Prelux are covered with plumage of barred, black and white pattern. A sex of chicks is determined with a speed of feathering; male chicks have slower feathering speed than females of the same type. The Prelux-G is a heavier type of a chicken; 18 weeks old hens weighed 1.8 kg, and after one year of laying the value reached 2.5 kg. Prelux-G is not only used as a good layer hen but also a meat chicken. Especially popular is meat of castrated roosters – capons. Hens of the Prelux-G in average lay 308 eggs per year, with each egg reaching 60 g.

=== Prelux-R ===
Prelux-R (prelux rjava and rjavi prelux in Slovenian, Prelux Brown and Brown Prelux in English) is a type of commercial layer crossbreed. Such hybrids are a result of pairing hens of the Slovenian Silver and roosters of the Slovenian Brown. This brown coloured layer hen's appearance resembles foreign brown breeds and hybrids. The type's feature are autosex offspring, with male chicks being white and female chicks being yellowish brown. It is a relatively light hen; 18 weeks old animals weigh in average 1.7 kg, and after one year of laying hens weigh 2.2 kg. The typical Prelux-R will lay 294 eggs per year; with eggs being somewhat heavier than in other hybrids layers, 65 g.

=== Prelux-BRO ===
Chickens of the type Prelux-BRO (also Prelux-bro) are heavier (meat type) hens, that are used for raising broilers. Animals of this type are derived from the meat breed Slovene Late-feathered Hen, that serves as a grandparent father breed for producing mothers of hybrids Prelux-BRO. A procedure of crossbreeding includes pairing a rooster of the Slovene Late-feathered Hen and a hen of the Slovene Early-feathered Hen. Female offspring of this parents is being bred with roosters of the Slovenian Fathering Hen, resulting in broilers of the Prelux-BRO type. Sexing is based on the speed of feathering; with males having slower feathering speed than females. Usually such broilers are raised extensively; either free or closed, occasionally within ecological way of farming. Since hens of the Prelux-bro are slow growing animals, they are less appropriate for breeding in big, industrial plants.

== See also ==
- List of Slovenian domestic animal breeds
