= Slovenian Brown Hen =

Chicken breed

- Other names: Slovene: Slovenska rjava kokoš
- Country of origin: Slovenia
- Use: Primarily eggs

Traits
- Weight: Male: 2.5–3.0 kg; Female: 1.8–2.2 kg
- Skin color: Yellow
- Egg color: Brown
- Comb type: Single

Classification

Notes
- Used as a parent breed for obtaining commercial crossbreeds
- Chicken; Gallus gallus domesticus

Slovenian Brown Hen (Slovene: Slovenska rjava kokoš) is a traditional breed of domestic chicken, originating in Slovenia. It was developed at the end of the 20th century at the Biotechnical Faculty of University of Ljubljana. Animals of this breed are brown coloured layer hens that are also used as parents for commercial crossbreeds sold under the trademark Prelux.

== History and distribution ==
The Slovenian Brown Hen is a young and by classification of Slovenian domestic animal breeds a traditional breed that was developed in the 1970s on the Department of Animal Science of Biotechnical Faculty of Ljubljana. The breed was derived from North American chicken breed Rhode Island Red, which was first exhibited in Americas in year 1895 and in year 1903 already imported into European countries. This American breed was once extremely popular and favoured among Slovenian breeders and it was found both on bigger farms as well as on smaller farms' backyards.

Today the Slovenian Brown Hen is found mostly on the PRC for Poultry Breeding of Biotechnical Faculty of Ljubljana, as layer hens of the breed are less interesting for breeding on big commercial farms. By the data from year 2020 there are 2910 animals of Slovenian Brown Hen in Slovenia, with breed's population trend being labeled as increasing.

== Features ==
=== Appearance ===
Based on its constitution and its purpose the breed is classified as a breed of layer hens. Individuals of the Slovenian Brown Hen are in average lighter than animals of both Slovenian Silver and Slovenian Barred Hen; roosters weigh 2.5–3.0 kg and hens are a bit lighter with their 1.8–2.2 kg. Members of the breed are typical monochrome chickens of dark brown colour without a presence of any special pattern. Roosters have somewhat shiny feathers that are characterised by a metallic shine. An exaggerated and long-lasting exposure to sun leads to a loss of a typical shade and fading of bird's plumage colouration. Tail of male animals is consisting of feathers of dark green and black colour. A simple and single comb is middle-sized and usually a bit downcast. An animal's head has orange eyes, brown beak and tiny earlobes that are red in roosters and paler – purple in hens. Chickens' legs are of yellow colour with brownish toes and a lower part of their feet. The Slovenian Brown Hen reaches its sexual maturity after living for about 19–20 weeks.

=== Breeding and usage ===
The Slovenian Brown Hen is an industrial breed intended for intensive breeding. Usually hens are raised in coups that are equipped with a system of lights enabling a periodical illumination. 16 weeks old pullets are transferred to a one of possible breeding programmes. A part of animals is being reared on modern battery farms, where they are placed in enriched (battery) cages. Remaining animals are either a part of combined breeding with hens being partly on litter and partly on lattice, or a part of typical barn breeding with free-run chickens.

The Slovenian Brown Hen is primarily a layer hen that lays brown coloured quality eggs weighing in average 61 grams. In average a typical hen will lay approximately 295–305 eggs per year. In comparison to Slovenian Silver and Slovenian Barred the Slovenian Brown is a better layer breed and more efficiently spends its fodder, while at the same time its eggshell is darker. Hens of this breed are also useful as parents for Slovenian commercial chickens sold under the brand name Prelux. By breeding different Slovenian traditional breeds of chicken we get hybrids that are known for better egg laying abilities. The so-called Prelux-R (prelux rjava in Slovenian, Prelux Brown in English) is a result of pairing hens of Slovenian Silver and roosters of Slovenian Brown. The Prelux-G (prelux grahasta in Slovenian, Prelux Barred in English) is being derived from a rooster of Slovenian Barred Hen and a hen of Slovenian Brown Hen. The third possible combination is a breeding of a hen of Slovenian Barred and a rooster of Slovenian Brown resulting in the Prelux-Č (prelux črna in Slovenian, Prelux Black in English). Castrated roosters – capons of Prelux-G are useful as a source of quality capon meat.

== See also ==
- Slovenian Barred Hen
- Slovenian Silver Hen
- List of Slovenian domestic animal breeds
