= Incubation =

The word incubation may refer to:

== Science and technology ==
- Egg incubation, sitting on or brooding the eggs of birds and other egg-laying animals to hatch them
- Incubation (psychology), the process of thinking about a problem subconsciously while being involved in other activities
- Incubation period, medical term for the time between being exposed to infection and showing first symptoms
- Incubator (culture), a device used to grow and maintain course of cell cultures

== Arts and entertainment ==
- Incubate (festival), an annual independent culture festival in Tilburg, The Netherlands
- Incubation: Time Is Running Out, 1997 turn-based tactics computer game from Blue Byte
- "Incubation", song released on the B-side of the Komakino flexi-single in 1980, and on the Substance (Joy Division album) in 1988
- Biohazard 4 Incubate, a 97-minute DVD detailing the story of Resident Evil 4

== Religion and spirituality ==
- Dream incubation, practiced technique of learning to "plant a seed" in one's mind for a specific dream topic to occur
- Incubation (ritual), a religious practice of sleeping in a sacred area with the intention of experiencing a divinely inspired dream or cure
- Salaat-ul-Istikhaarah, an Islamic prayer with the intention of searching for guidance for a decision or issue

== Other uses ==
- Business incubator, a company that helps new and startup companies to develop by providing services such as management training or office space

== See also ==
- Incubator (disambiguation)
- Early feeding
