= Yellow-hair chicken =

Breed of chicken

Yellow-hair chicken, also called yellow-feather chicken (Chinese: 黃毛雞; pinyin: huángmáo jī; Cantonese Yale: wòhng mouh gāai), is a breed of chicken traditionally raised for meat in China. It takes about 120 days to grow to market size compared to as little as 41 days for specially-bred broiler chickens.

Yellow-hair chicken is flavorful, but takes longer and is more difficult to cook than a typical broiler as it has less fat and more meat. Most whole birds sold in markets in China are Yellow-hair. Outside of China it is only available in Chinese restaurants, and, even there, usually not on the English menu. The breed is being displaced in China by broiler chickens.

Yellow-hair chicken is not necessarily free range, although it could be, if raised that way.
