= Free run =

Free run or Free Run may refer to:

- Free run (farming stewardship), a method of farming stewardship where the animals are not kept in cages but are allowed to wander around inside an enclosed structure, such as a barn
- Free run (oenology), a method to gather the must from grapes without pressing
- "Free Run", a 2012 song by Chris Brown from Fortune

== See also ==
- Free running (disambiguation)
- Freerunner (disambiguation)
