= Avian immune system =

System of biological structures

The avian immune system is the system of biological structures and cellular processes that protects birds from disease.

The avian immune system resembles that of mammals since both evolved from a common reptilian ancestor and have inherited many commonalities. They have also developed a number of different strategies that are unique to birds. Most avian immunology research has been carried out on the domestic chicken, Gallus gallus domesticus. Birds have lymphoid tissues, B cells, T cells, cytokines and chemokines like many other animals. They can also have tumours, immune deficiency and autoimmune diseases.

== Overview ==
The physiology and immune system of birds resembles that of other animals. The lymphomyeloid tissues develop from epithelial or mesenchymal anlages that are full of haematopoetic cells. The Bursa of Fabricius, thymus, spleen and lymph nodes all develop when haematopoetic stem cells enter the bursal or thymic anlages and become competent B and T cells. The avian immune system is divided into two types of immunity, the innate and adaptive ones. The innate immune system includes physical and chemical barriers, blood proteins and phagocytic cells. In addition, complement serum proteins, which are a part of the innate immune system, work with antibodies to lyse target cell. Adaptive immunity, on the other hand, kicks in when the innate system fails to stop invading pathogens. The adaptive response includes targeted recognition of specific molecular features on the surface of the pathogen. Birds, like other animals, have B cells, T cells and humoral immunity as part of their adaptive response.

== Structure ==
Various bird organs function to differentiate avian immune cells: the thymus, Bursa of Fabricius and bone marrow are primary avian lymphoid organs whereas the spleen, mucosal associated lymphoid tissues (MALT), germinal centers, and diffuse lymphoid tissues are secondary lymphoid organs. As a general rule, birds do not have lymph nodes. However, lymph nodes are described in geese and swans. The thymus, where T cells develop, is located in the neck of birds. The Bursa of Fabricius is an organ that is unique to birds and is the only site for B cell differentiation and maturation. Located in the rump of birds, this organ is full of stem cells and very active in young birds but atrophies after six months. Bronchial associated lymphoid tissue (BALT) and gut associated lymphoid tissue (GALT) are found along the bronchus and intestines, respectively. In the avian respiratory system, there are heterophils, which are an important part of bird immunity. Within the head, there is head associated lymphoid tissues (HALT) that contain the Harderian gland, lacrimal gland and other structures in the larynx or nasopharynx. The Harderian gland is located behind the eyeballs and is the major component of HALT. It contains a large number of plasma cells and is the main secretory body of antibodies. Alongside these primary and secondary lymphoid organs, there is also the lymphatic circulatory system of vessels and capillaries that communicate with the blood supply and transport the lymph fluid throughout the bird's body.

=== T cells ===
The antigen recognition by T cells is a remarkable process dependent on the T cell receptor (TCR). The TCR is randomly generated and thus has extensive diversity in the peptides-MHC complexes it can recognize. Using monoclonal antibodies that are specific for chicken T cell surface antigens, the development of T cells in birds is studied. The differentiation pathways, functional processes and molecules of T cells are highly conserved in birds. However, there are some novel features of T cells that are unique to birds. These include a new lineage of cytoplasmic CD3+ lymphoid cells (TCR0 cells) and a T cell sublineage that expresses a different receptor isotypes (TCR3) generated exclusively in the thymus. Homologues of the mammalian gamma, delta and alpha beta TCR (TCR1 and TCR2) are found in birds. However, a third TCR, called TCR3, has been found in avian T cell populations that lack both TCR1 and TCR2. These were found on all CD3+ T cells and were either CD4+ or CD8+. This subset of T cells, as others, develops in the thymus and gets seeded throughout the body with the exception of the intestines. The pattern of accessory molecules expressed by avian T cells resembles mammalian α/β T cells. High CD8 expression precedes the dual expression of CD4 and CD8 but following clonal selection and expansion, avian T cells cease to express either CD4 or CD8.

=== B cells ===
The central organ for B cell development in birds is the Bursa of Fabricius. The function of the bursa was discovered when it was surgically removed from neonatal chicks and this led to an impaired antibody response to Salmonella typhimurium. It is now clear that the bursa is the primary site of B cell lymphopoeisis and that avian B cell development has some unique properties compared to human or mouse models. Almost all the B cell progenitors in the bursa of 4-day-old chickens express IgM on their cell surface. Studies have shown that B cells of 4– to 8-week-old birds are derived from 2–4 allotypically committed precursor cells in each follicle. Bursal follicles are colonized by 2–5 pre-bursal stem cells and these undergo extensive proliferation after they are committed to an allotype. Expression of IgM is controlled by a biological clock as opposed to the bursal microenvironment. Moreover, the source of all B cells in adult birds was determined to be a population of self-renewing sIg+ B cells.

== Development ==
In studying the development of the avian immune system, the embryo offers several advantages such as the availability of many embryos at precise stages of development and distinct B and T cell systems. Each population differentiates from a primary lymphoid organ: T cells in the thymus and B cells in the Bursa of Fabricius. Research has found that early feeding of hydrated nutritional supplements in chickens heavily affects the immune system development. This is often measured by weight of the Bursa of Fabricius, improved resistance to disease and earlier appearance of IgA. Unlike other animals, newly hatched chicks are born with an incomplete immune system. Here, the amniotic fluid and yolk of the egg contain the maternal immunity to be passed on to the hatchling. Swallowing of the amniotic fluid during hatching confers immunity to these chicks until their immune system develops fully. In the first six weeks of the bird's life, continuous gene conversion in the bursa completes the immune system. Upon hatch, birds do not have a library of genetic information for B cells to use for antibody production. Instead, J cells mature in the bursa during the first six weeks and then go on to seed other organs of the immune system. As a result, birds are highly susceptible to pathogens in the first few weeks after hatching. Research found that T cells from mature chickens proliferated extensively and produced high levels of IL-2 and other cytokines. On the other hand, T cells from 24 hour-old chickens failed to proliferate and could not secrete cytokines. Gene conversion within the bursa leads to the development of antibodies that are diverse in their recognition ability. Mammalian V, D and J gene segments allow for many combinations and therefore, yield a vast repertoire of antibodies. However, birds have only a single functional copy of the V_{L} and J_{L} genes for the Ig light chain and a single functional copy of the V_{H} and J_{H} heavy chain genes. This results in a low diversity from gene rearrangements of Ig heavy and light chains. However, clusters of pseudogenes upstream of the heavy and light gene Ig loci take part in somatic gene conversion – a process where pseudogenes replace the V_{H} and V_{L} genes. This diversifies the repertoire of bird antibodies.

== Avian innate immune system ==
Little is known about the innate immune system of birds. Most research has been focused on chickens due to the increased threat of viral diseases within the poultry population. The innate immune response is known to be essential for viral infection and as a result, the publication of the full chicken genome sequence is a source for identifying possible adjuvants and immunity genes.

== Unique features ==
=== Transfer of maternal immunity ===
Avian immunity begins to develop at the end of embryonic life but the majority of early immunity is obtained via passive acquisition of maternal antibodies. Such antibodies are found within the egg when it is laid and originated from the yolk of the egg. Kramer and Cho have shown immunoglobulins in both the egg white and in the embryo. Maternal IgA and IgM get transferred to the egg as it passes down the oviduct.

=== TTP ===
An important element of immune systems in various animals is the protein tristetraprolin (TTP). This plays a key anti-inflammatory role by regulating TNFα. Mouse models with TTP knockouts result in chronic and often deadly inflammation when exposed to small amounts of pathogen-associated molecular patterns (PAMPs). However, TTP and its homologs is altogether absent from birds. Avian genomes have been searched for similar sequences to TTP and bird cell lines have been exposed to foreign proteins and bacteria molecules known to stimulate TTP production but no evidence of TTP has been found. The missing protein poses a very different immune response regulation in birds as opposed to mammals, reptiles and amphibians.

=== Organs ===
The avian T cell population, like that of mammals develops in the thymus. However, the thymus in birds is a paired organ composed of many separated lobes of ovoid tissue in the neck. These are close to the vagus nerve and the jugular vein and are most active in young hatchlings. It is postulated that this organ is linked to erythropoietic function and closely associated with the avian breeding cycle. The removal of the thymic lobes has been correlated to birds rejecting allogeneic skin grafts and delayed skin reactions.

The Bursa of Fabricius is a globular or spherical epithelial and lymphoid organ. The inner surface is littered with folds, which resemble Peyer's patches in mammals and obscure the lumen. Its growth is correlated with the rapid body growth. It regresses and disappears about the time of sexual maturity. The bursa, as studied through bursectomy at different developmental stages, indicates sequential development of IgG, IgM and IgA. The secondary (peripheral) lymphoid tissue also includes unique lymphoid nodules in the digestive tract and solitary nodules scattered throughout the body, a characteristic of avian species. Meanwhile, lymph nodes only occur in some water, marsh and shore species.

== Diseases ==
Control of infectious disease is essential for the production of healthy poultry flocks. Vaccination programs have been used extensively in North American factory farming methods to induce avian immune responses against bird pathogens. These include Marek's Disease, Duck Hepatitis Virus, Chicken Anemia Virus, Turkeypox, Fowlpox and others. Bird immunity is reliant on a complex network of cell types and soluble factors that must properly function in order for large commercial poultry flocks to survive.

Infectious bursal disease virus and chicken anemia are ubiquitous and have increased interest in combatting avian pathogens. Parasites of birds are another emerging concern since the crowded nature of poultry farms facilitates easy spreading.

=== Immunosuppressive diseases ===
Several immunosuppressive agents are encountered by birds including viruses, bacteria, parasites, toxins, mycotoxins, chemicals and drugs. The most common immunosuppressive viruses are Infectious Bursal Disease Virus (IBDV), Avian Leukosis, Marek's Disease (MD) and Hemorrhagic Enteritis Virus (HEV). Concurrent immunosuppressive infections are an emerging concern in the poultry industry whereby early infection with IBDV causes the MD virus to come out of dormancy and contribute to active disease. New studies show that stress is the number one cause of immunosuppression in birds. Stressors leave birds more susceptible to infectious agents and therefore, new poultry management guidelines may become a necessity.

=== Birds as vectors ===
The migratory nature of birds poses a distinct danger for the spreading of diseases. Without being affected by the infectious agent, birds can act as vectors in spreading psittacosis, salmonellosis, campylobacteriosis, mycobacteriosis, avian influenza, giardiasis and cryptosporidiosis. These zoonotic diseases can be transmitted to humans. In the case of avian influenza (H5N1 strain), water birds can be infected with the low pathogenic form or the high pathogenic form. The former induces mild symptoms such as a drop in egg production, ruffled feathers and mild effects on the avian respiratory tract. The highly pathogenic form spreads much more rapidly and can infect multiple tissues and organs. Massive internal bleeding and hemorrhaging follow and this has earned the H5N1 virus the moniker "chicken ebola."

=== Tumours ===
Much like other animals, birds are prone to cancers and tumours. This refers to the abnormal growth of cells in a tissue or organ that can be either malignant or benign. Internal cancers can occur in the kidneys, liver, stomach, ovary, muscles or bone. Squamous cell carcinoma is a form of skin cancer that birds obtain, manifesting on the wing tips, toes, and around the beak and eyes. The cause is believed to be high exposure to UV rays. Additionally, a cancer of the connective tissue, known as fibrosarcoma, is often seen in the leg or wing. This occurs in many parrot species, cockatiels, macaws and budgerigars. Treatment options include amputation and surgery.

== See also ==
- Bird anatomy
