= Freerunner =

Freerunner or free runner may refer to:

- Freerunning
- Freerunner (film)
- Free Runners, an English-language manga about free running
- Neo FreeRunner
- A baserunner placed on second base in extra innings in baseball or softball

== See also ==
- Free run (disambiguation)
- Free running (disambiguation)
