= Free running (disambiguation) =

Free running can refer to:

- Freerunning, a physical discipline created by Sebastien Foucan, which is inspired by the movements of Parkour and Tricking
- Free-running sleep is sleep with no outside regulation of its timing
- Free Running, a 2007 video game developed by Rebellion and published by Ubisoft
- Free Runners, an original English-language manga

== See also ==
- Freerunner (disambiguation)
- Free run (disambiguation)
- Free Runtimes
