= Incubator =

An incubator is anything that performs or facilitates various forms of incubation, and may refer to:

== Biology and medicine ==
- Incubator (culture), a device used to grow and maintain microbiological cultures or cell cultures
- Incubator (egg), a device for maintaining the eggs of birds, reptiles, or fish to allow them to hatch
- Incubator (neonatal), a device used to care for premature babies in a neonatal intensive-care unit

== Arts and entertainment ==
- "Incubator" (Farscape episode), a 2001 episode of the American TV series
- "Incubator", a song by the Israeli rock band, HaClique, in their 1981 album, Ima Ani Lo Rotze Lehigamel
- Incubator, Kyubey's true identity in the anime TV series Puella Magi Madoka Magica

== Other uses ==
- Business incubator, a company that helps new and startup companies to develop by providing services such as management training or office space
- Apache Incubator, a gateway for open source projects under the Apache Software Foundation
- Wikimedia Incubator, a wiki project hosted by the Wikimedia Foundation
- Cocoa butter incubator, a device used in chocolate production to maintain cocoa butter at a precise temperature for the formation of stable beta crystals during the "silk" tempering method

== See also ==
- Incubation (disambiguation)
