= Poultry microbiome =

The poultry microbiome is an understudied, yet extremely impactful part of the poultry industry. Poultry is defined as any avian species used for production purposes such as food or down feathers. The United States consumes more poultry, specifically broiler meat, than any other type of protein. Worldwide, poultry makes up 33% of consumed meat. This makes poultry extremely valuable and the impact of the poultry microbiome on health and production even more valuable. Antonie van Leeuwenhoek was the first to notice microbes inside animals through stool samples giving light to further research into the gut microbiome. His discovery lead to the ever evolving study of the microbiota and microbiome. The microbiota is the entirety of living organisms including bacteria, viruses, fungi, and archaea in an environment. The microbiome is the combination of the microbiota and the additional activities in that system including metabolites and chemicals in a habitat. Much of the work done to characterize the poultry microbiome has been accomplished over the past decade and was done through the use of 16s rRNA sequencing.

== Production impacts ==
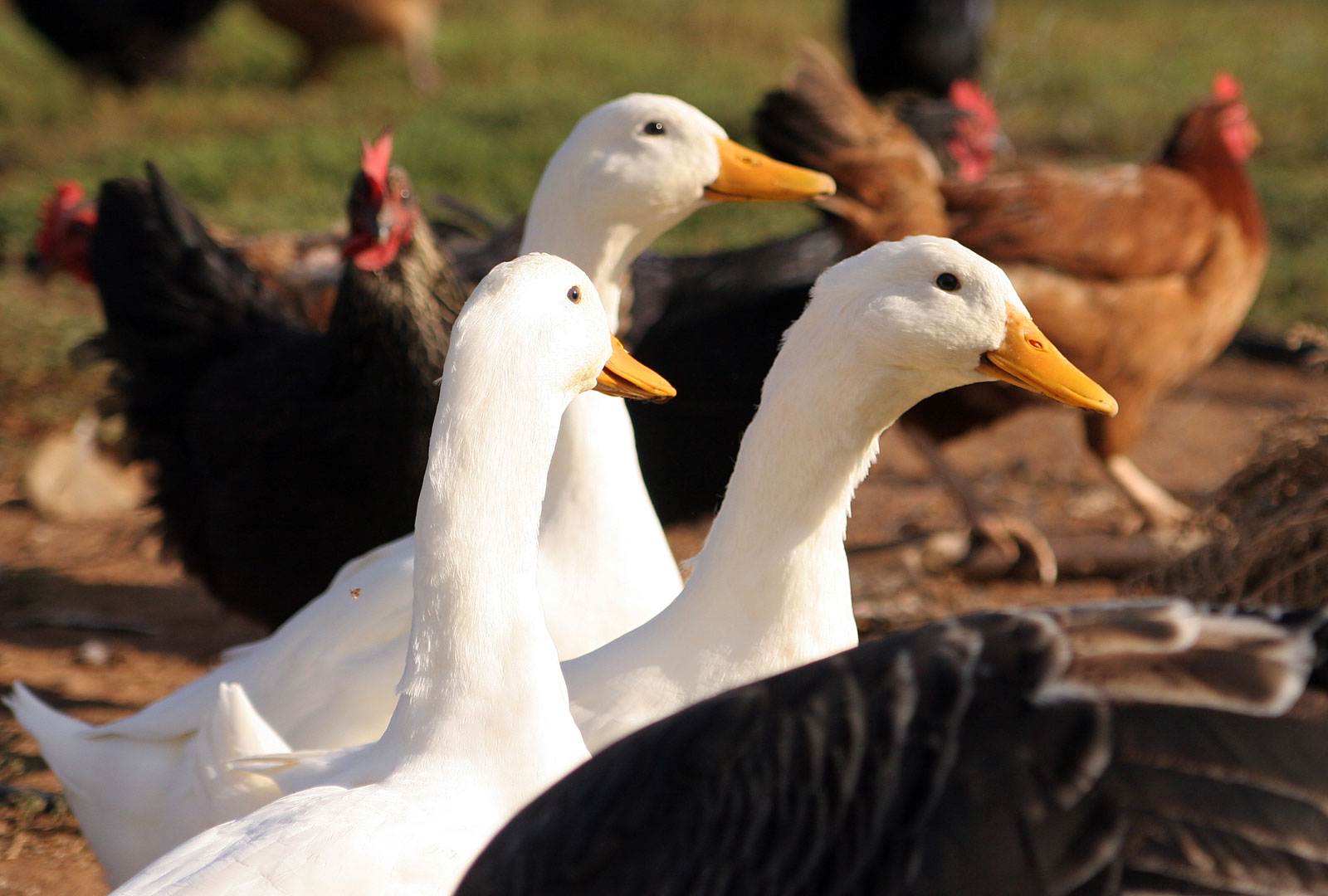
Ducks, chickens, geese, quails, and turkeys are all examples of poultry that humans use for food or other byproducts. The microbiota found in the birds intestine as well as on their skin and feathers contribute to their health and production.

The poultry microbiome includes all living microbes found in and on the bird as well as in the environment. However, studies of the microbes that are important to production have concentrated heavily within the digestive tract. Increased amounts of Lactobacillus, Cornyebacterium, Coprobacillus and Slakia found in the ceca of chickens has been shown to increase feed conversion ratios in broiler chickens. The opposite can be said for Akkermansia muciniphila and cecal Parabacteriocides which have been shown to have negative effects on feed conversation. In addition, correlations in gut microbiota variance and feed conversion rates have been shown in laying hens. The study on laying hens found that Anaerosporobacter, Candidatus Stoquefichus, and Fournierella are negatively associated with feed conversion in regards to egg production and body weight maintenance. Although understudied, turkeys and ducks are assumed to have very similar feed conversion correlations to microbiome.

Alternatively, the importance of the microbiome in regards to duck hatching egg production has been studied. Evidence shows that ducks with more diverse microbiota in their bedding or litter, specifically containing large amounts of Staphylococcus, Corynebacterium, and Brevibacterium have worse egg quality and hatching rates. The environment that poultry are raised in can have a significant impact on their production because it can significantly impact the microbes that they are exposed to and that ultimately colonize inside and on the birds.

== Pathogen colonization ==
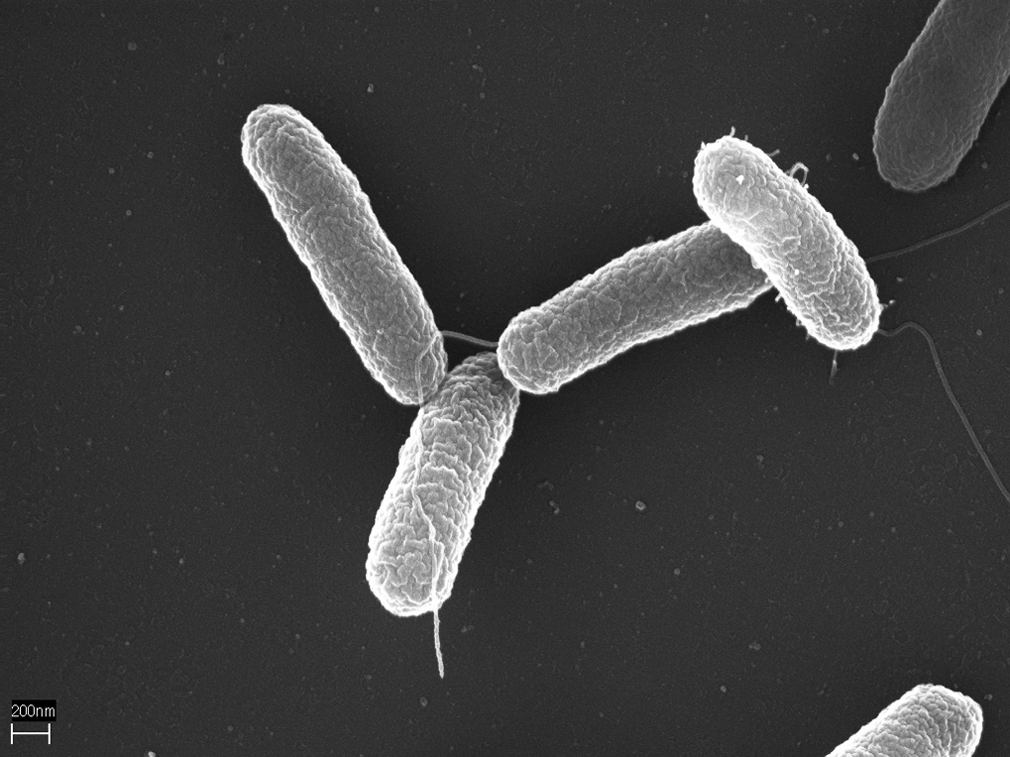
Salmonella Typhimurium is estimated to cause nearly 200,000 deaths per year worldwide per the CDC. Because this bacteria can survive and colonize in the digestive tract of poultry sanitation practices and cooking techniques are extremely important to avoid infection. It is estimated by the CDC that 1 in every 25 packages of poultry products contains Salmonella.

Pathogen colonization is one of the most important parts of the poultry microbiome because it affects both the birds health as well as consumers health. The most well known bacterial pathogen in regards to poultry in Salmonella because of its risk to human health and high prevalence. Salmonella can easily colonize in the intestines of poultry, however some studies are working with targeted phages to remove salmonella from the microbiome of broiler chickens. Salmonella Typhimurium is a human pathogen, that poses a risk to consumers because of its ability to colonize the poultry digestive tract without harming the bird. Fortunately, researchers are studying different microbial interactions, such as probiotics, and metabolite influences on preventing Salmonella colonization and restoring healthy gut microbiota after infection. Another pathogen that can colonize the gut of poultry is Clostridium perfringens. Types A and C of this bacterium can cause necrotic enteritis, characterized by decaying and inflamed intestinal tissue. However this is only under certain dietary conditions and in combination with the parasite coccidia. In a study conducted in 2021 where researchers worked to characterize the bacterial make-up of the turkey respiratory tract they found that the presence of Ornithobacterium and Mycoplasma, puts turkeys at a higher risk for respiratory infections. It has also been shown in turkeys that domesticated turkeys have less microbial diversity and more pathogenic and antibiotic resistant strains of bacteria persistent in their gut than their wild counterparts.

== Anatomical areas ==
=== Feathers and skin ===
The exterior of poultry is covered in some combination of feathers and skin that has a unique microbiome based on its metabolites and exposure to the environment. Skin and feather bacteria are often aerobic due to the exposer to oxygen. There appears to be no difference in flagellated vs non flagellated bacteria being present on or attaching to the exterior of the chicken. The microbiome of the exterior of the chicken is of extreme concern to the poultry processing industry because of avoiding pathogen presence for food consumption.

Each section of the avian digestive tract creates a different environment that is optimum for different bacteria. The microbiome in each section is also specialized for specific purposes like nutrient absorption, competitive exclusion of pathogens, chemical breakdown, and fermentation.

=== Digestive tract ===
The digestive tract of the avian species is different than all other animals. The avian digestive system includes the esophagus, crop, proventriculus, gizzard, duodenal loop, jejunum, ileum, ceca, large intestine and cloaca. Each on these sections has a unique pH and microbiota living inside it. In ducks Bacteroidetes have been found to be the prominent phyla found in the ceca. Where as, the other regions of the digestive tract were more diverse supporting Firmicutes, Proteobacteria, Bacteroidetes, Cyanobacteria, and Actinobacteria. It is also noted that the digestive tract increases in abundance and diversity of bacteria as you move from the proventriculus to the cloaca or rectum of the bird.

=== Reproductive tract ===
The reproductive tract, also known as the oviduct, is equally as diverse as the digestive tract in differentiated areas and differences in chemical and physiological properties. The female poultry reproductive tract consists of the ovary, infundibulum, magnum, isthmus, shell gland, vagina, and cloaca. Meanwhile, the male chicken and turkeys reproductive tract consists of the testis, ductus deferens, ejaculatory duct, and cloaca. In ducks the male anatomy is slightly different due to the presence of a penis. The microbiome in the oviduct of turkeys has been characterized with 19 phyla, including several pathogenic species and has been linked to juvenile turkey health. In addition, researchers have found that there is a strong correlation between Bacteroides fragilis, Bacteroides salanitronis, Bacteroides barnesiae, and Clostridium leptum being present in the vagina and reproductive tract of a laying hen and her producing a higher quantity and quality of eggs.
