= Free Runners =

Original English-language manga

- Cover of Free Runners vol. 1 (2007), art by Jennyson Rosero
- Author: Bill Strauss
- Illustrator: Jennyson Rosero
- Publisher: (United States) Seven Seas Entertainment
- Original run: 2007
- Volumes: 1

Free Runners is an original English-language manga about free running with story by Bill Strauss and art by Jennyson Rosero. Volume 1 was released on July 25, 2007, and was published by Seven Seas Entertainment.

== Plot ==
The story in 1997 Brooklyn, when a series of unfortunate events causes the disappearance of Steve "Steep" Gonzales' brother. Years pass and Steep is now in high school. He does fairly well, but does not have any friends in school as he spends much of his time caring for his ill mother and drawing. He keeps out of trouble and even holds down a job at a convenience store. He often entertains the idea of being truly free from the daily grind and anxiety of isolation.

However, his whole outlook on life is changed when a Traceur steals a Snapple from the store. Steep pursues the thief, but is astounded when the Traceur runs through the urban span with such speed and agility that Steep has to give up. The next day, he is confronted by Liza, an attractive girl Steep has never associated with before. She convinces him to meet her after school where she takes him to the outskirts of town. There Steep meets a group who call themselves the "GCC" or "Gravity-Challenged Crew." He is also surprised to see Deezy, the Traceur who stole the Snapple from the convenience store.

After Steep learns that the group have been watching him for some time, they attempt to recruit him and turn him into a full-fledged Traceur or as they say in North America, Free Runner. Thus begins Steep's initiation into the world of Free-Running.
