= Broiler =

Chicken bred for meat

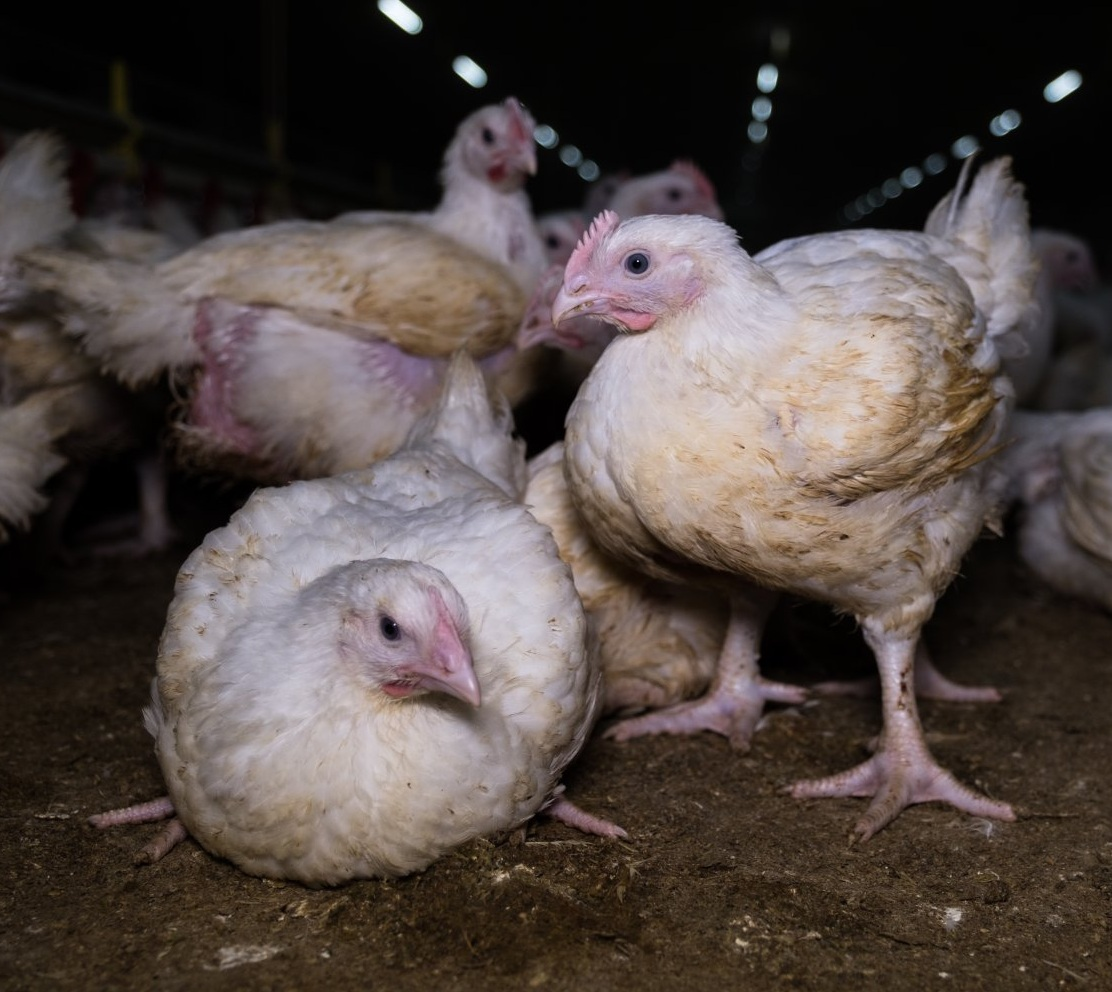
- Distribution: Worldwide
- Use: Meat, feathers

Traits
- Skin color: Yellow, brown, black or mixed
- Egg color: white/light brown
- Comb type: red

Classification

A broiler is any chicken (Gallus gallus domesticus) bred and raised specifically for meat production. Most commercial broilers reach slaughter weight between four and six weeks of age, although slower growing breeds reach slaughter weight at approximately 14 weeks of age. Average broilers have white feathers and yellowish skin. Broiler or, less commonly, broiler-fryer is also used sometimes to refer specifically to younger chickens under 2.0 kilograms (4 1/2 lb), as compared with the larger roasters.

Due to extensive breeding selection for rapid early growth and the husbandry used to sustain this, broilers are susceptible to several welfare concerns, particularly skeletal malformation and dysfunction, skin and eye lesions and congestive heart conditions. Management of ventilation, housing, stocking density and in-house procedures must be evaluated regularly to support good welfare of the flock. The breeding stock (broiler-breeders) do grow to maturity but also have their own welfare concerns related to the frustration of a high feeding motivation and beak trimming. Broilers are usually grown as mixed-sex flocks in large sheds under intensive conditions.

== Modern breeding ==
Before the development of modern commercial meat breeds, broilers were mostly young male chickens culled from farm flocks. Pedigree breeding began around 1916. Magazines for the poultry industry existed at this time. A crossbred variety of chicken was produced from a male of a naturally double-breasted Cornish strain, and a female of a tall, large-boned strain of white Plymouth Rocks. This first attempt at a meat crossbreed was introduced in the 1930s and became dominant in the 1960s. The original crossbreed was plagued by problems of low fertility, slow growth and disease susceptibility.

Modern broilers have become very different from the Cornish/Rock crossbreeds. As an example, Donald Shaver (originally a breeder of egg-production breeds) began gathering breeding stock for a broiler program in 1950. Besides the breeds normally favored, Cornish Game, Plymouth Rock, New Hampshire, Langshans, Jersey Black Giant, and Brahmas were included. A white feathered female line was purchased from Cobb. A full-scale breeding program was commenced in 1958, with commercial shipments in Canada and the US in 1959 and in Europe in 1963. As a second example, color sexing broilers was proposed by Shaver in 1973. The genetics were based on the company's breeding plan for egg layers, which had been developed in the mid-1960s. A difficulty facing the breeders of the color-sexed broiler is that the chicken must be white-feathered by slaughter age. After 12 years, accurate color sexing without compromising economic traits was achieved.

=== Artificial insemination ===
Artificial insemination is a mechanism in which spermatozoa are deposited into the reproductive tract of a female. Artificial insemination provides a number of benefits relating to reproduction in the poultry industry. Broiler breeds have been selected specifically for growth, causing them to develop large pectoral muscles, which interfere with and reduce natural mating. The amount of sperm produced and deposited in the hen's reproductive tract may be limited because of this. Additionally, the males' overall sex drive may be significantly reduced due to growth selection. Artificial insemination has allowed many farmers to incorporate selected genes into their stock, increasing their genetic quality.

Abdominal massage is the most common method used for semen collection. During this process, the rooster is restrained and the back region located towards the tail and behind the wings is caressed. This is done gently but quickly. Within a short period of time, the male should get an erection of the phallus. Once this occurs, the cloaca is squeezed and semen is collected from the external papilla of the vas deferens.

During artificial insemination, semen is most frequently deposited intra-vaginally by means of a plastic syringe. In order for semen to be deposited here, the vaginal orifice is everted through the cloaca. This is simply done by applying pressure to the abdomen of the hen. The semen-containing instrument is placed 2–4 cm into the vaginal orifice. As the semen is deposited, the pressure applied to the hen's abdomen is released simultaneously. The person performing this procedure typically uses one hand to move and direct the tail feathers, while using the other hand to insert the instrument and semen into the vagina.

== General biology ==
Modern commercial broilers, for example, Cornish crosses and Cornish-Rocks, are artificially selected and bred for large-scale, efficient meat production. They are noted for having very fast growth rates, a high feed conversion ratio, and low levels of activity. Modern commercial broilers are bred to reach a slaughter-weight of about 2 kg (4.4 lb) in only 5 to 7 weeks. As a consequence, the behaviour and physiology of broilers reared for meat are those of immature birds, rather than adults. Slow growing free-range and organic strains have been developed which reach slaughter-weight at 12 to 16 weeks of age.

Typical broilers have white feathers and yellowish skin. Recent genetic analysis has revealed that the gene for yellow skin was incorporated into domestic birds through hybridization with the grey junglefowl (G. sonneratii). Modern crosses are also favorable for meat production because they lack the typical "hair" which many breeds have that must be removed by singeing after plucking the carcass.

Both male and female broilers are reared for their meat.

=== Behavior ===
Broiler behavior is modified by the environment, and alters as the broilers' age and bodyweight rapidly increase. For example, the activity of broilers reared outdoors is initially greater than broilers reared indoors, but from six weeks of age, decreases to comparable levels in all groups. The same study shows that in the outdoors group, surprisingly little use is made of the extra space and facilities such as perches – it was proposed that the main reason for this was leg weakness as 80 per cent of the birds had a detectable gait abnormality at seven weeks of age. There is no evidence of reduced motivation to extend the behavioral repertoire, as, for example, ground pecking remained at significantly higher levels in the outdoor groups because this behavior could also be performed from a lying posture rather than standing.

Examining the frequency of all sexual behaviour shows a large decrease with age, suggestive of a decline in libido. The decline in libido is not enough to account for reduced fertility in heavy cocks at 58 weeks and is probably a consequence of the large bulk or the conformation of the males at this age interfering in some way with the transfer of semen during copulations which otherwise look normal.

=== Feeding and feed conversion ===
Chickens are omnivores and modern broilers are given access to a special diet of high protein feed, usually delivered via an automated feeding system. This is combined with artificial lighting conditions to stimulate eating and growth and thus the desired body weight.

In the U.S., the average feed conversion ratio (FCR) of a broiler was 1.91 kilograms of feed per kilograms of liveweight in 2011, an improvement from 4.70 in 1925. Canada has a typical FCR of 1.72. New Zealand commercial broiler farms have recorded the world's best broiler chicken FCR at 1.38. The microbiome of the broiler also has a large effect in addition to the birds nutrition and genetics on overall FCR.

== Welfare issues ==
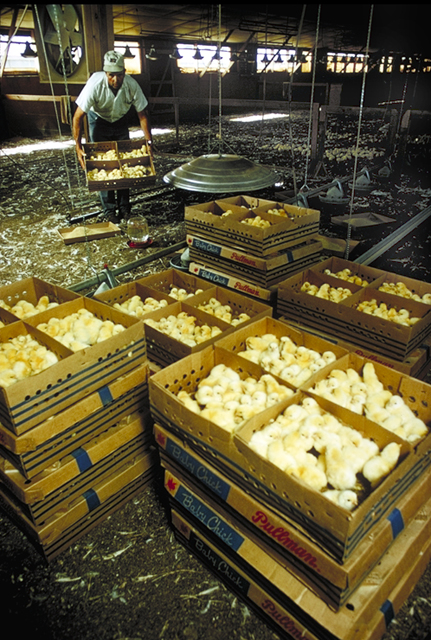
One-day-old chicks arriving to be unpacked and placed in shed

Artificial selection has led to a great increase in the pace of which broilers develop and reach slaughter-weight. Selection and husbandry for very fast growth means there is a genetically induced mismatch between the energy-supplying organs of the broiler and its energy-consuming organs. This genetic selection for very fast growth at the cost of welfare has led animal welfare campaigners to describe the most commonly used broiler breeds as Frankenchickens.

Rapid growth can lead to metabolic disorders such as sudden death syndrome by acute heart failure, killing up to 3% in Europe, and ascites, a slower form of heart failure that affect an additional 5% worldwide. Breeding for increased breast muscle affects the way chickens walk and puts additional stress on their hips and legs. There is a high frequency of skeletal problems in broilers, mainly in the locomotory system. These leg abnormalities impair the locomotor abilities of the birds, and lame birds spend more time lying and sleeping. Increased inactivity is linked with an increase in dermatitis caused by a greater amount of time in contact with ammonia in poultry litter. Broilers are usually kept at high stocking densities. This can reduce feed intake and growth. Management conditions (litter quality, temperature and humidity) are however more important than stocking density. Many broilers die during the processes of catching, packing and transport.

== World production and consumption ==
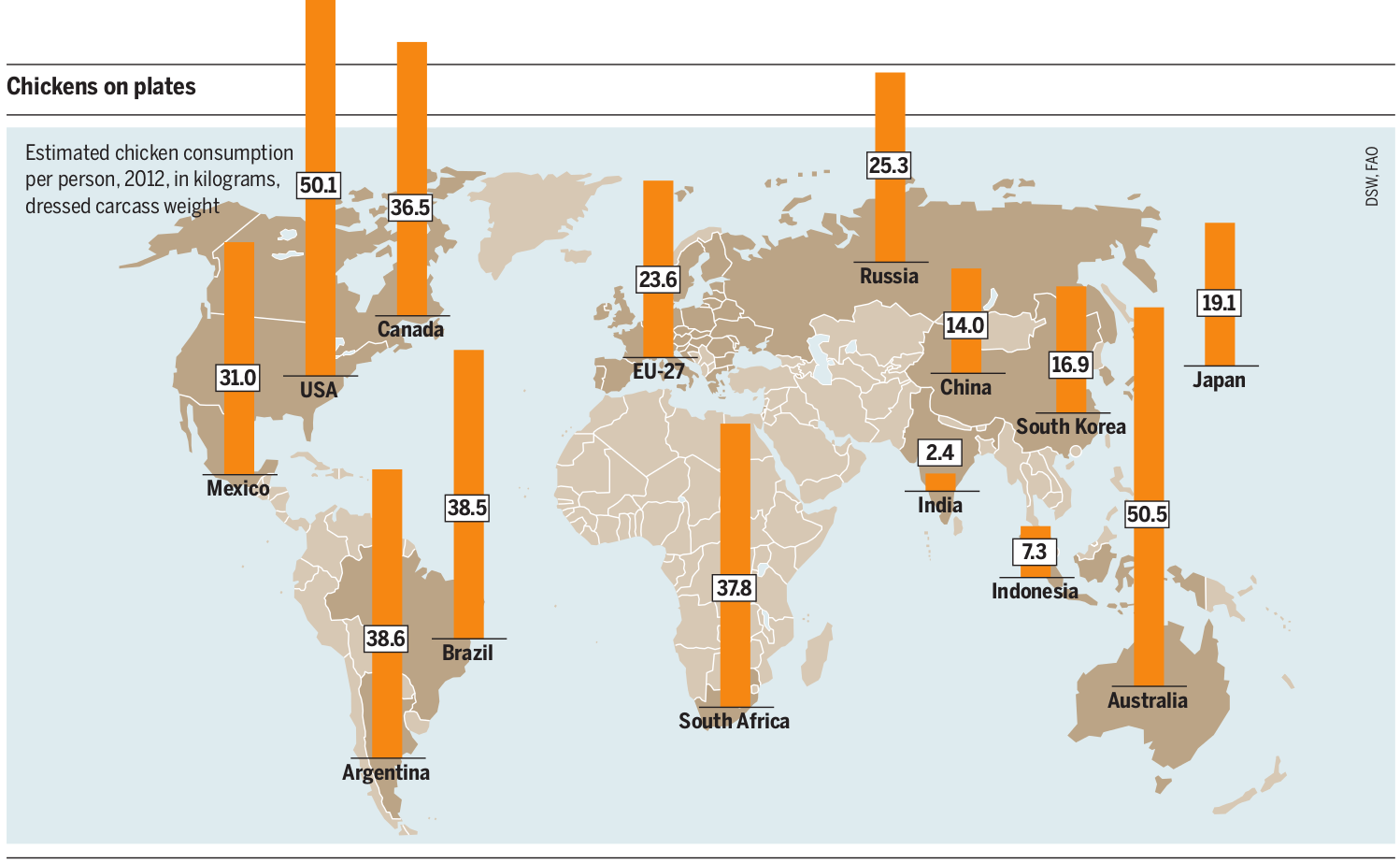
Estimated chicken consumption per person in 2012

The commercial production of broiler chickens for meat consumption is a highly industrialized process. There are two major sectors: (1) rearing birds intended for consumption and (2) rearing parent stock for breeding the meat birds. A report in 2005 stated that around 5.9 billion broiler chickens for eating were produced yearly in the European Union. Mass production of chicken meat is a global industry and at that time, only two or three breeding companies supplied around 90% of the world's breeder-broilers. The total number of meat chickens produced in the world was nearly 47 billion in 2004; of these, approximately 19% were produced in the US, 15% in China, 13% in the EU25 and 11% in Brazil.

Consumption of broilers is surpassing that of beef in industrialized countries, with demand rising in Asia. Worldwide, 86.6 million tonnes of broiler meat were produced in 2014, and as of 2018, the worldwide estimation of broiler chick population was approximately 23 billion.

== Impacts of climate change ==
It is believed that the thermal comfort zone for poultry is in the 18–25 °C (64–77 °F) range. Some papers describe 26–35 °C (79–95 °F) as the "critical zone" for heat stress, but others report that due to acclimatization, birds in the tropical countries do not begin to experience heat stress until 32 °C (90 °F). There is wider agreement that temperatures greater than 35 °C (95 °F) and 47 °C (117 °F) form "upper critical" and lethal zones, respectively.

Average daily temperatures of around 33 °C (91 °F) are known to interfere with feeding in both broilers and egg hens, as well as lower their immune response, with outcomes such as reduced weight gain/egg production or greater incidence of salmonella infections, footpad dermatitis or meningitis. Persistent heat stress leads to oxidative stress in tissues, and harvested white meat ends up with a lower proportion of essential compounds like vitamin E, lutein and zeaxanthin, yet an increase in glucose and cholesterol. Multiple studies show that dietary supplementation with chromium can help to relieve these issues due to its antioxidative properties, particularly in combination with zinc or herbs like wood sorrel.

Resveratrol is another popular antioxidant administered to poultry for these reasons. Though the effect of supplementation is limited, it is much cheaper than interventions to improve cooling or simply stock fewer birds, and so remains popular. While the majority of literature on poultry heat stress and dietary supplementation focuses on chickens, similar findings were seen in Japanese quails, which eat less and gain less weight, suffer reduced fertility and hatch eggs of worse quality under heat stress, and also seem to benefit from mineral supplementation.

Around 2003, it was estimated that the poultry industry in the United States already lost up to $165 million annually due to heat stress at the time. One paper estimated that if global warming reaches 2.5 °C (4.5 °F), then the cost of rearing broilers in Brazil increases by 35.8% at the least modernized farms and by 42.3% at farms with the medium level of technology used in livestock housing, while they increase the least at farms with the most advanced cooling technologies. On the contrary, if the warming is kept to 1.5 °C (2.7 °F), costs at moderately modernized farms increase the least, by 12.5%, followed by the most modernized farms with a 19.9% increase, and the least technological farms seeing the greatest increase.

== See also ==
- Animal cruelty
- Animal welfare science
- Chicken
- Chicken tax
- Cobb 500
- Concentrated animal feeding operation
- Early feeding
- Intensive animal farming
- Poultry farming
- Ross 308
- The Chicken of Tomorrow
- Ayam Kampong
