= Early feeding =

In poultry farming, early feeding is the ad lib availability of feed and water for day-old chicks from the moment of hatching from the egg.

Early feeding has a positive effect on chick performance because development and maturation of important organs is not retarded post hatch, but continues. This results in better growth performance and a better health status of the chickens.

== The benefits of early feeding ==
Since the early 1990s, a lot of studies showed the benefits of early feeding and water on chick performance. In this paragraph a few studies are summarized to show the benefit of early feeding and water.

During the last few days of incubation, the residual yolk is retracted into the body cavity as an extension of the intestine. Post hatch, the residual yolk is the only nutrient source of the chicken until exogenous feed is available. Chickens can use the residual yolk for maintenance during the first few days post hatch. However, research has shown that development and maturation of the gastrointestinal tract, and important immune related organs is delayed in chickens that have to rely solely on their residual yolk and have no feed and water available between hatch and placement at the farm.

A study of Noy et al. (1996) showed that the residual yolk of chickens with access to feed during 96 hours after hatch reduced more rapid in size than in fasted birds. This can be caused by increased intestinal activity in fed chickens. A more rapid reduction in residual yolk size indicates that valuable nutrients are earlier used for important developmental steps.

Geyra et al. (2001) showed that fasting post hatch retarded body weight increase and intestinal growth. The effects of fasting were specific to both time of fasting and the intestinal segment examined (duodenum, jejunum or ileum). The jejunum appeared to be the most sensitive of the intestinal segments. Fasting between 0 and 48 hours post hatch decreased crypt size, the number of crypts per villus, crypt proliferation, villus area, and the rate of enterocyte (intestinal absorptive cells) migration in the duodenum and jejunum. Geyra et al. (2001) concluded that early access to feed is important for optimal early intestinal development.

Maiorka et al. (2003) also showed that the development of the gastrointestinal tract was directly linked to feed and water intake. They showed that relative weight and length of the jejunum and ileum increased when chickens were supplied with feed and water post hatch. In addition, intestinal mucosa development was affected by the availability of feed and water: the number of villi per area decreased because villi size increased. According to these findings Maiorka et al. (2003) hypothesized that the absence of physical stimuli caused by feed in the intestinal lumen and the specific need for certain nutrients, such as water, may be responsible for negative changes in the morphology of the intestinal mucosa.

Protein in the residual yolk is the source of antibodies from the chicken. To be effective, it is important that maternal antibodies move from the residual yolk into the bloodstream but also to sites of vulnerability such as the mucosal surfaces where bacteria and viruses can enter the body. Dibner et al. (1998) evaluated the effect of early feeding on the development of the immune system in broiler chickens. They showed that providing nutrients immediately post hatch resulted in heavier bursa weight, earlier appearance of biliary IgA and germinal centers (secondary lymphoid organs), and an improved resistance to a disease challenge. In broiler chickens the first week of life is not only important for further development of the gastrointestinal tract and important immune related organs but is also an important period for muscle production. Halevy et al. (2000) showed that the length and timing of fasting post hatch affects satellite cell activity. Short-term fasting can enhance satellite cell number. However, long-term fasting almost completely arrests cell mitosis and decreases the number of satellite cells. In the study of Halevy et al., (2000) the chickens that fasted during the first days of life did not regain their body weight or breast muscle weight by day 41, however chickens that fasted between day 4 and 6 post hatch had full growth compensation by day 41. Halevy et al. (2000) concluded that sufficient feed directly post hatch may be critical for later muscle development. A study of Noy and Sklan (1999) also showed that early feeding increased body weight and breast size at marketing age in chickens and poults. They showed that early feeding reduced mortality numerically.

== See also ==
- Poultry
- Wageningen University and Research Centre
