= Poultry litter =

Mixture of chicken's excretions, feed, feathers and bedding

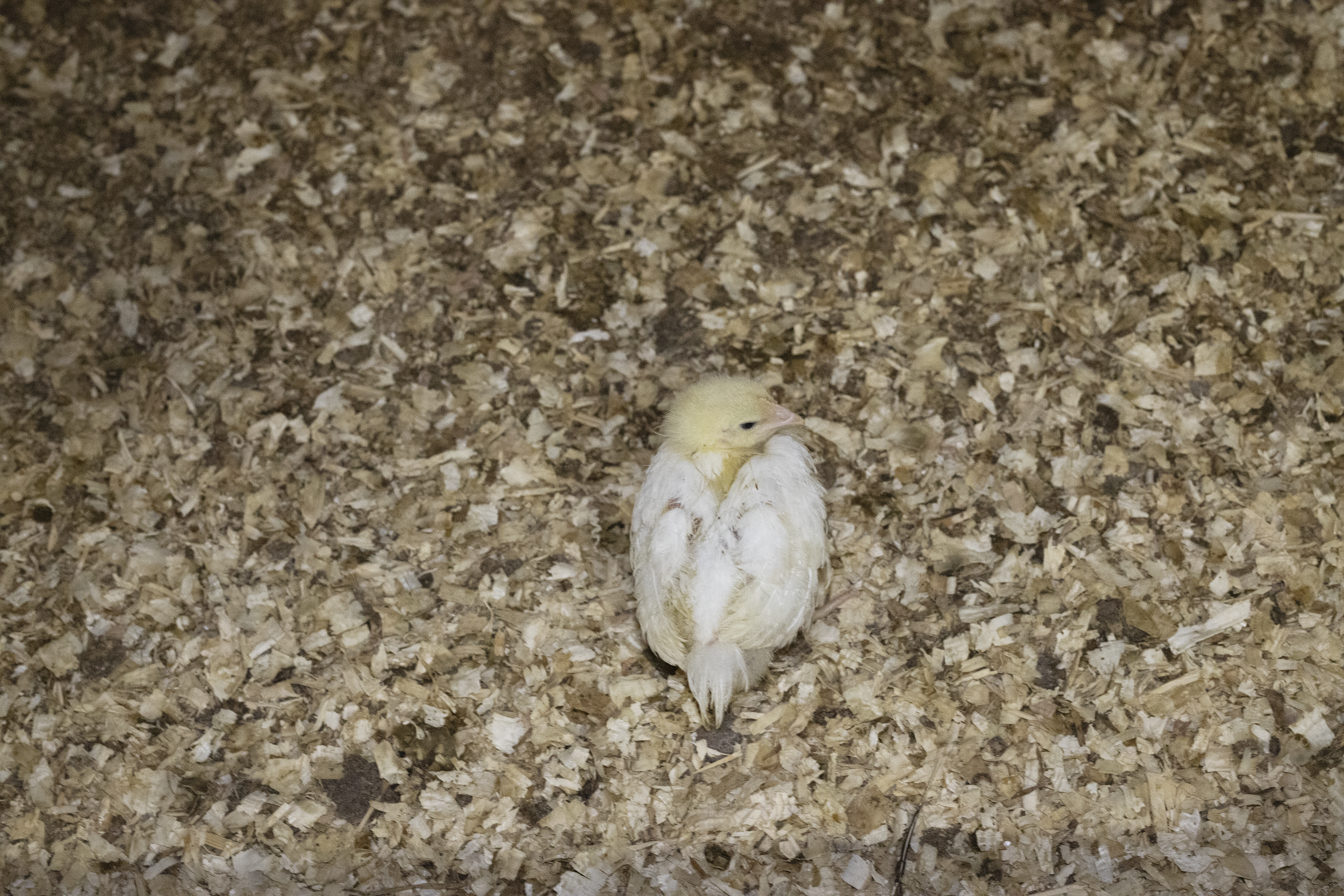
Small chicken on litter

In agriculture, poultry litter or broiler litter is a mixture of poultry excreta, spilled feed, feathers, and material used as bedding in poultry operations. This term is also used to refer to unused bedding materials. Poultry litter is used in confinement buildings used for raising broilers, turkeys and other birds. Common bedding materials include wood shavings, sawdust, peanut hulls, shredded sugar cane, straw, and other dry, absorbent, low-cost organic materials. Sand is also occasionally used as bedding. The bedding materials help absorb moisture, limiting the production of ammonia and harmful pathogens. The materials used for bedding can also have a significant impact on carcass quality and bird performance.

There are specific practices that must be followed to properly maintain the litter and maximize the health and productivity of the flocks raised on it. Many factors must be considered in successful litter management including time of the year, depth of the litter, floor space per bird, feeding practices, disease, the kind of floor, ventilation, watering devices, litter amendments, and even the potential fertilizer value of the litter after it is removed from the house. Most poultry are grown on dirt floors with some type of bedding material. Concrete floors and some specialized raised flooring are used at some facilities. In many areas of the United States, shavings from pine or other soft woods have historically been the bedding of choice for poultry production. Regionally, other materials have been the bedding material of choice due to regional cost and availability, such as rice hulls in the lower Mississippi River poultry production areas of Arkansas and Mississippi.

== Bedding materials ==
Growers consider a number of factors when determining which material to use as bedding in their facilities, with cost and availability being a major consideration. Bedding materials generally needs to be very absorbent, and must have a reasonable drying time. Many paper products, for instance, absorb moisture well but do not dry out appropriately. The material should also have a useful purpose once it has been used as a bedding material. Without a useful purpose for the used litter, poultry growers would need to dispose of unmanageable quantities of old litter. Large accumulations of litter stored unused for long periods of time are not ecologically acceptable even on a small scale, and would be non-sustainable from an industrial perspective.

Poultry bedding materials also have to be reasonably available. Some materials may meet industry goals once under the birds but if it is difficult to obtain, it will not find favor as a poultry litter. Finally, if a material is not cost competitive with current materials utilized, it will also not be used as a litter material. However, if the new material has increased value once removed from the poultry house compared to current litters or if the current litter material itself becomes difficult to obtain or the quality is decreases, poultry growers may decide to use the new litter material.

Bedding material must not be toxic to poultry or to poultry growers. It should not be excessively favorable for the growth of the litter beetle, a major pest. The effect on other livestock, pets, wildlife, and even plants must also be considered. Poultry can consume as much as 4% of their diet as litter, therefore any bedding material must not contain contaminants, such as pesticides or metals. Consumption by the birds due to litter eating or other bird behavior could affect production and potentially cause the meat or rendered products to become unusable. Pine shavings has been the bedding of choice because of performance, availability, and cost.

== Management practices ==
=== Moisture ===
The heating and ventilation systems in a poultry house must be continuously monitored to keep the moisture content of the litter controlled so that the litter remains friable (easily broken up or crumbly). If the litter becomes too wet and the litter is allowed to become "sealed", then the birds will be living on a damp, slippery and sticky surface. This sealed litter is what is referred to as being "caked". In this condition, the litter is simply saturated with water and is unable to dry out. A severe problem with litter moisture will result if large areas of the house floor surface are caked. The more common issue, however, is having localized areas of caking near leaky watering cups, nipples, troughs or roofs. Watery droppings caused by nutrition and/or infectious agents can also be a cause of excessive moisture in poultry litter.

If litter is not kept at an acceptable moisture level, very high bacterial loads and unsanitary growing conditions may result producing odors (including ammonia), insect problems (particularly flies), soiled feathers, footpad lesions and breast bruises or blisters. This can affect the health and mortality rate of the flock, and could result in quality issues when birds reared under such poor conditions reach the processing plant. In a well-managed broiler house, litter moisture normally averages between 25 and 35 percent. Litter that is managed correctly with the moisture content kept within the acceptable range can be reused if no disease or other production problems occur. On the other hand, caked litter must be removed between flocks and replaced with new litter.

=== Litter re-utilization ===
Some broiler producers are simply removing cake and excess litter after house washing and then placing broilers on old litter for an extended number of flocks. Their expectation is that total clean out is not needed unless there some disease or other bio-security issues. However, producers doing this should be aware that total disinfection under these conditions is probably not possible.

Re-utilization of at least some fraction of used litter as a supplement for fresh wood shavings bedding in broiler houses has been found to not significantly increase pathogens and indicator microorganisms in litter compared to using fresh wood shavings. No consistent significant differences have been found regarding flock performance when comparing houses using fresh litter with houses re-utilizing litter.

A major issue with re-utilization of previously used litter is the generation of ammonia. Ammonia is produced by microbial breakdown of fecal material in the litter. It is well documented in the literature that higher moisture levels result in higher ammonia production. The caked portion of the litter is very high in moisture and nitrogen and should be removed from the house to reduce ammonia generation and provide optimal air quality for chicks during the brooding period. Add litter treatments to reduced ammonia generation. Controlling ammonia with a litter treatment can save money on energy costs by reducing the amount of air exchange required to maintain adequate air quality.

=== Litter amendments ===
High ammonia levels in poultry houses can result in poor bird performance and health and a loss of profits to the grower and integrator. When broilers and turkeys are raised on litter, amendments can be used to reduce ammonia levels in the houses and improve productivity. Uric acid and organic nitrogen (N) in the bird excreta and spilled feed are converted to ammonium (NH4+) by the microbes in the litter. Ammonium, a plant-available N form, can bind to litter and also dissolve in water. Depending on the moisture content, temperature, and acidity of the litter, a portion of the ammonium will be converted into ammonia (NH3). Ammonia production is favored by high temperature and high pH (i.e., alkaline conditions). Ammonia is a pungent gas that irritates the eyes and respiratory system and can reduce resistance to infection in poultry. At high-enough concentrations, ammonia will reduce feed efficiency and growth while increasing mortality and carcass condemnations. The result is economic loss to the grower and integrator. Because chicks are more susceptible to the negative effects of ammonia, placing broods in houses with high levels of builtup litter is particularly harmful. Also, the high temperatures required during brooding increase ammonia levels, and moist litter (due to leaky drinkers or high water tables) and insufficient winter ventilation contribute to high ammonia levels as well. In these situations, some growers rely mainly on ventilation to reduce ammonia in the houses. However, ammonia loss from the litter reduces its fertilizer value, and venting ammonia into the environment can cause health and environmental problems.

There are several types of litter amendments available to manage ammonia the most common being acidifiers, and various microbial and enzymatic treatments.

==== Acidifiers ====
This type of amendment creates acidic conditions (pH less than 7) in the litter, resulting in more of the ammoniacal nitrogen being temporarily retained as ammonium rather than ammonia. Ammonium is a highly reactive ion that bonds with sulfates, nitrates and phosphates to form ammonium salts that improve the nutrient value of litter when land applied as fertilizer. The acidity also creates unfavorable environment for urolytic bacteria reducing the production of enzymes that contribute to ammonia formation, resulting in reduced ammonia production. Urolytic bacteria have a pH optimum of approximately 8.3 and litter amendments lower the litter surface pH to below 4.0 for a short period of time, usually between 3–5 days depending on the litter amendment. There are several different types of acidifiers, such as alum, acidified liquid alum, sodium bisulfate, ferric sulfate, and sulfuric acid, that have been used by the poultry industry. These products vary in effectiveness as the pH is raised by the activity of the poultry within a couple of weeks. The combination of using litter amendments and poultry house ventilation provides a healthy and comfortable rearing environment. Controlling volatilized ammonia in poultry and livestock rearing environments is critical to maintaining a high level of animal health, well-being and efficient live performance. Most of these products are regulated by DOT and HAZMAT and physical properties for the different products rang from mild irritant to corrosive. Most litter acidifiers are corrosive but when applied according to manufacturers instructions are safe and effective.

==== Other amendments ====
There have been a number of other substances used for ammonia control. A study in Finland found that peat, which is high in humic acid, when used as poultry litter it was quite effective in controlling ammonia. A number of products have also appeared on the market using de-nitrifying or nitrogen-fixing bacteria.

=== Windrowing ===
One common practice is windrow composting. This is a deep stacking of litter, usually by plowing the litter into long rows the length of the poultry house. This is an incomplete composting process, and can eliminate harmful pathogens such as E. coli and Salmonella providing that the internal stack temperature reaches 140 to 160 °F (60 to 71 °C). Re-spreading the stacked litter and allowing it to dry would be expected to decrease ammonia and extend litter life.

== Disposal and re-use ==
Broilers have on average a 47-day growout period, during which the typical broiler chicken will generate about two pounds of litter, if you add the manure and bedding materials. Actual manure generation will be lower because it is only a fractional component of litter. This translates to an average of about 0.7 ounce per day per bird, varying considerably over the life of the bird. This means that a single broiler house, which can contain well over 20,000 birds can generate over 40,000 lb (18,000 kg) of litter per flock.

Historically, applications for used poultry litter have included, and still include, use as feed for cattle in the commercial beef industry, land application as a fertilizer for crops or pastures, or occasionally as potting material for the greenhouse and plant container industries. Recently there has been an upsurge in the use of poultry litter as a bio-fuel source for electrical cogeneration and gasification.

=== Use as fertilizer ===
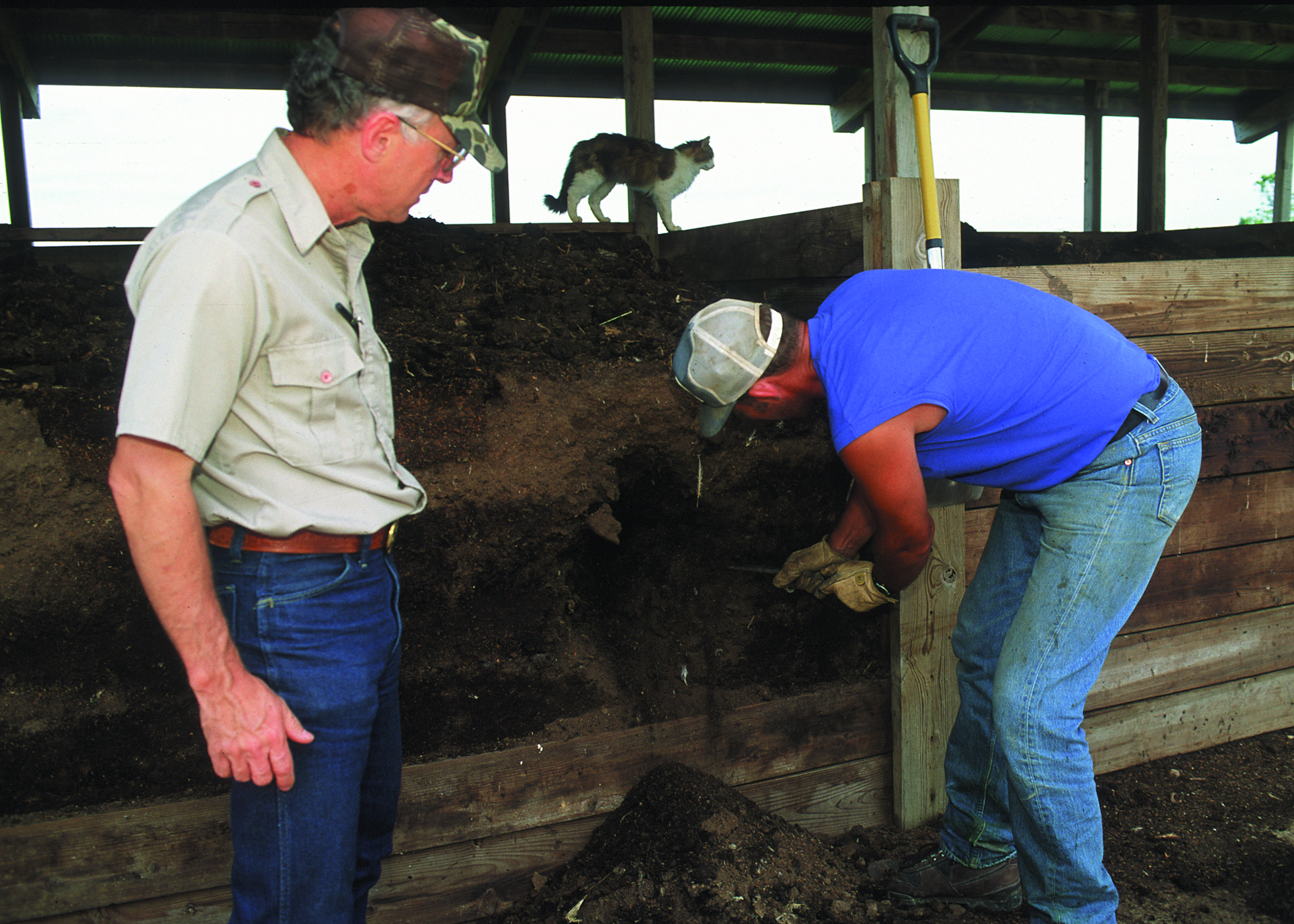
Two American farmers check a poultry litter composter.

Poultry litter's traditional use is as fertilizer. As with other manures, the fertilizing value of poultry litter is excellent, but it is less concentrated than chemical fertilizers, giving it a relatively low value per ton. This makes it uneconomical to ship long distances, and it tends to lose its nitrogen value fairly quickly. Extracting its value requires that it be used on nearby farms. This limits its resale value in regions where there are more poultry farms than suitable nearby farmland. It is rich in nitrogen, phosphorus, and carbon.

=== Use as cattle feed ===
Traditionally used as fertilizer, it is now also used as a livestock feed as a cost-saving measure compared with other feedstock materials, particularly for beef animals.

The use of poultry litter as food for beef cattle is legal in the United States. Prior to 1967, the use of poultry litter as cattle feed was unregulated but that year the FDA issued a policy statement that poultry litter offered in interstate commerce as animal feed was adulterated, effectively banning the practice. In 1980, FDA reversed this policy and passed regulation of litter to the states. In December 2003, in response to the detection of bovine spongiform encephalopathy (mad cow disease) in a cow in the state of Washington, the FDA announced plans to put in place a poultry litter ban. Because poultry litter can contain recycled cattle proteins as either spilled feed or feed that has passed through the avian gut, the FDA was concerned that feeding litter would be a pathway for spreading mad cow disease. In 2004, FDA decided to take a more comprehensive approach to BSE that would remove the most infectious proteins from all animal feeds. The FDA decided at this point that a litter ban was unnecessary in part based on comments by the North American Rendering Industry. In 2005, the FDA published a proposed rule that did not include a litter ban and in 2008 the final rule did not include the ban either.

=== Use as fuel ===
There are currently several electrical generating plants in the UK, and recently in the US, that are utilizing poultry and turkey litter as their primary fuel. The first three in the world were developed by Fibrowatt Ltd in the UK, founded by Simon Fraser, who was appointed an OBE for his contribution to renewable energy. These are: Thetford (38.5 MWe), Eye (12.7 MWe) and Glanford (13.5 MWe - now switched to burning meat and bonemeal). The fourth, Westfield (9.8 MWe), was developed by Energy Power Resources, which now owns all four. Simon Fraser's son and partner, Rupert Fraser, went on to develop the first US plant through his company Fibrowatt LLC., at Benson, MN (55 MWe).

On a smaller scale, poultry litter is used in Ireland as a biomass energy source. This system uses the poultry litter as a fuel to heat the broiler houses for the next batch of poultry being grown thus removing the need for LPG gas or other fossil fuels.

Some companies are also developing gasification technologies to utilize poultry litter as a fuel for electrical and heating applications, along with producing valuable by-products including activated carbons and fertilizers.

== See also ==
- Environmental issues with agriculture
- Poultry
- Poultry farming
- Poultry farming in the United States
- Deep litter – system of livestock bedding
