= Free run (animal) =

Stewardship farming method of livestock and animal welfare

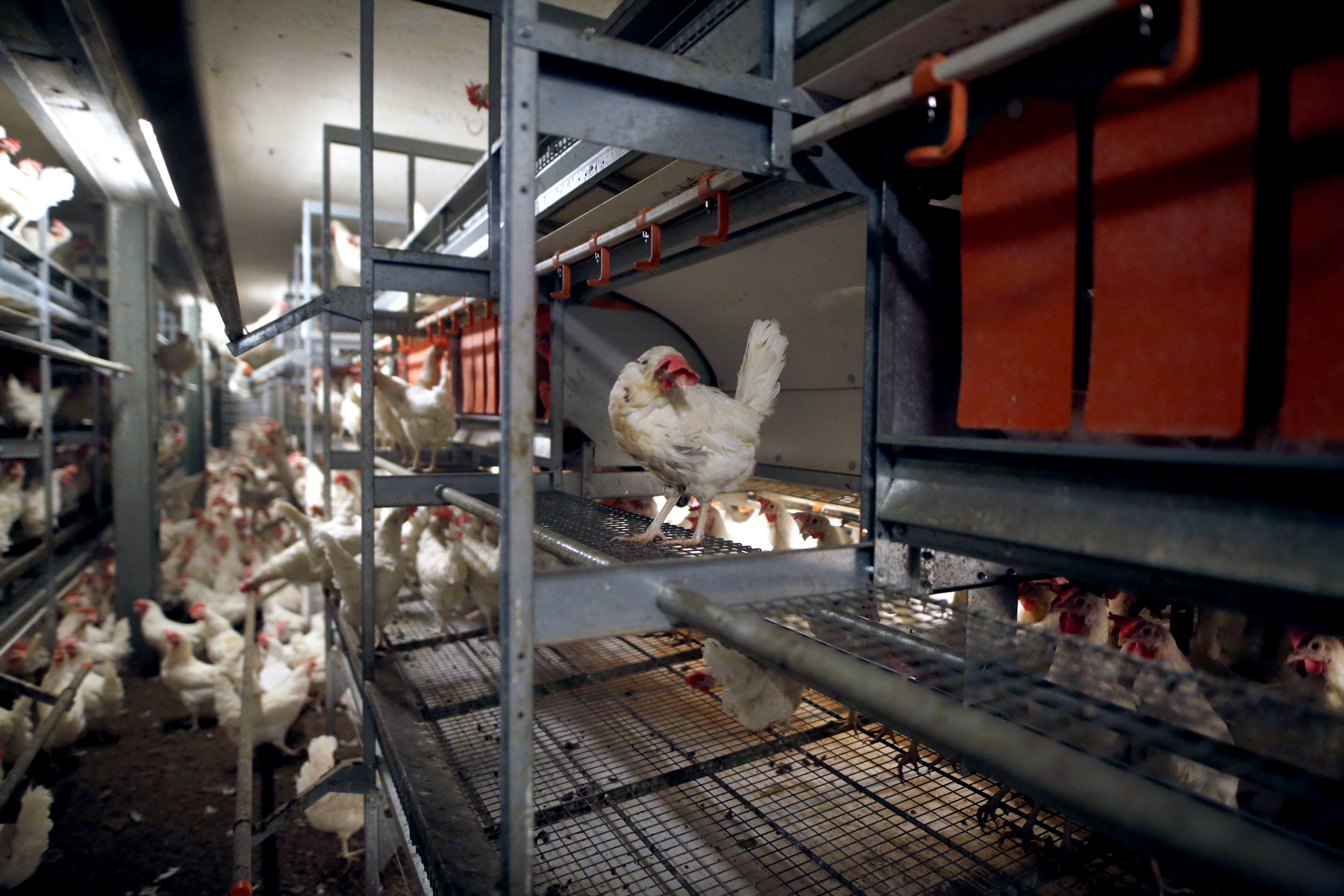
Free run chickens

Free run is a method of farming stewardship where the animals are not kept in cages but are allowed to wander around inside an enclosed structure, such as a barn. Unlike free range animals they do not have access to the outside. It is just cheaper than free range, but it is not looked upon as highly as by those concerned about animal welfare.

== See also ==
- Free Range
- Ethical consumerism
- Moral purchasing
