= Drosophila X virus =

Virus classification
- (unranked): Virus
- Realm: Riboviria
- Kingdom: Orthornavirae
- Phylum: incertae sedis
- Family: Birnaviridae
- Genus: Entomobirnavirus
- Species: Drosophila X virus

Species of virus

Drosophila X virus (DXV) belongs to the Birnaviridae family of viruses. Birnaviridae currently consists of three genera. The first genus is Entomobirnavirus, which contains DXV. The next genus is Aquabirnavirus, containing infectious pancreatic necrosis virus (IPNV). The last genus is Avibirnavirus, which contains infectious bursal disease virus (IBDV). All of these genera contain homology in three specific areas of their transcripts. The homology comes from the amino and carboxyl regions of preVP2, a small 21-residue-long domain near the carboxyl terminal of VP3, and similar small ORFs sequences.

DXV was named after Drosophila melanogaster, where it was first isolated. DXV was first isolated and named in 1978. DXV was discovered as a contaminant in adult D. melanogaster while studying rhabdoviruses. Assay results of DXV showed that DXV induces sensitivity to both carbon dioxide and NH_{2}, which suggests general anoxia. Therefore, the pathogenic pathway for DXV leads to anoxia sensitivity and death of D. melanogaster. By negative contrast electron microscopy the DXV components were first visualized. The origin of DXV is unknown and unclear. It was thought that DXV could have been pre-existent in Drosophila broods in a non-pathogenic form. Additionally, it was speculated that DXV might have originated as a contaminant from fetal calf serum in infection type studies because it was documented that endogenous bovine viruses were already in fetal calf serum.

== Structure, genome, and replication ==
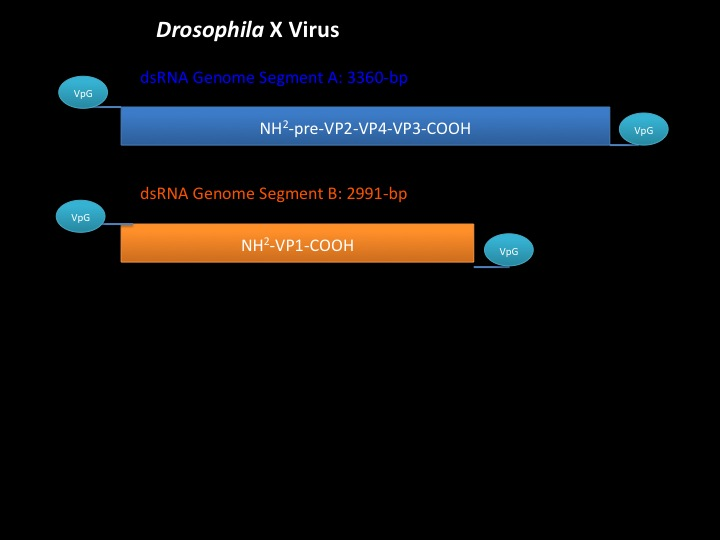
Drosophila X virus genome has two segments: segment A & segment B.

DXV is a Baltimore Class III naked (non-enveloped) virus. The capsid of this protein contains an icosahedral geometry (T=13) consisting of 260 trimeric VP2 capsomeres. Specifically, DXV contains a bi-segmented dsRNA genome. Both segments of the DXV genome contain 5’ terminal GGA triplet and a 3’ terminal CCC triplet consensus, which is consistent with birnaviridae (Shwed, 2002). The segment A genome is 3360-bp in length. Segment A encodes a polyprotein sequence as follows: NH2-preVP2-VP4-VP3-COOH. This segment contains a large and small ORF. The segment B genome is 2991-bp in length. Segment B encodes a polypeptide sequence as follows: NH2-VP1-COOH. The 5’ UTR of segment B is homologous to segment A, but unlike segment A, there is only one ORF. Unusually, VP1 can be in two forms; as a free RdRp and as the genome-liked protein (VpG) that attaches to both 5’ end segments of the DXV through a Ser-5’-GMP phosphodiester bond. The replication of DXV follows the characterized dsRNA virus replication cycle.

The large ORF of segment A consists of 3069 nucleotides. The UTRs are characterized as 107-bp on 5’ side and 157-bp on 3’ end. The start codons can be at either position 102, or two codons downstream at position 108. However, the initiation codon starts at the 108-bp. The translation of the large ORF transcript produces a 114-kDa polyprotein. The mature VP4 protein, viral protease, assists this process to increase the processing of the polyprotein to generate preVP2 capsid protein, VP3 viral ribonucleoprotein (RNP), and additional VP4 proteins. In addition VP3 proteins can associate with pre-VP2 as a structural protein and with VP1 to function as a transcriptional activator.

The small ORF of segment A consists of 711 nucleotides. This ORF is in a location that extends across VP4/VP3 junction, although the precise position is unknown. The mechanism for transcribing the small ORF is unknown. However, the possibility of ribosomal frameshifting has been ruled out since the small ORF site does not contain the characteristic hallmarks, such the 7 nucleotide long “slippery sequence” or downstream pseudoknot that is seen in other members of Birnaviridae. It is hypothesized the small ORF is translated in a mechanism that uses subgenomic transcripts. In any case, the translation of the small ORF transcript produces a 27-kDa polypeptide. This polypeptide consists of 28 of basic, mainly arginine, residues. However this polypeptide has not been detected in infected cells.

The segment B transcript encodes it encodes a 112.8-kDa VP1 polypeptide once translated. This polypeptide has been characterized to be the RNA-dependent RNA polymerase (RdRp) and the VpG. This polypeptide is 977 amino acids in length, making it the largest encoded RdRp in the Birnaviridae family. The RdRp contains a consensus GTP-binding site and is thought to contain self-guanylylation activity, making it consistent with the Birnaviridae RdRp capacity.

== Tropism ==
Currently, DXV does not infect vertebrates. It is known that invertebrates, such as insects, are hosts for DXV, but their specific tissue tropism is not known for certain. Tracheal cells were thought to be a possible target because there is evidence that Drosophila flies that are infected by DXV suffered from lack of oxygen supply to their tissues, which eventually leads to death. Based on previous studies, DXV was unsuccessfully cultured in vertebrate cells lines and mouse brain.

== Genetic variability ==
It has not been shown yet that DXV naturally infects Drosophila flies therefore; there are no wild-type strains of DXV. The Culex Y virus (CYV) is a tentative member of the genus that DXV is in. It has been proposed that CYV could act as a wild-type counterpart in studies that rely on DXV. In addition, the Espirito Santo virus (ESV) is defined as a sister species to DXV. This particular virus, ESV, was observed in an Aedes albopictus cell culture, which was obtained from a patient's serum infected with DENV-2. A difference between the ESV and CYV would be CYV's ability to independently replicate without on other viruses in insect cell culture. A non-AUG start codon in ORF5 has been shown in Drosophila and may regulate translation, which indicates its function in entomobirnavirus host in reactions. When ORF5 is expressed, it is thought to mediate ribosomal frameshifting. A heptanucleotide that is located upstream of ORF (1897UUUUUUA) is found in both ESV and DXV. Together with phylogenetic analysis and the location differences of nucleotide and amino acids between CYV and ESV, it has been shown that CYV and ESV is one sister species to DXV.

== Research ==
Although widely used in the laboratory, DXV has never been found as a natural infection of Drosophila, and was originally identified in laboratory cell culture. DXV can infect fruit flies of the genus Drosophila and is commonly used to study innate immunity in the common model organism Drosophila melanogaster. The virus is also often used to study RNA interference as a mechanism of viral immunity in Drosophila.

DXV was a contaminant that was isolated in infectious studies with a member of the Rhabdoviridae family, the Sigma virus. Since then, DXV has been widely used in research and has significantly contributed to the current knowledge of insect specific immune system. Infection studies with DXV has shed light on the innate immune response and RNA interference (RNAi) in Drosophila flies. Additionally, using DXV in Drosophila showed that RNAi is a major form of an antiviral effector mechanism. In regards to the Toll pathway in antiviral response, there is evidence to show this pathway inhibits DXV replication in Drosophila. Furthermore, findings from DXV research on Drosophila significantly influenced studies on the dengue virus (DENV) to learn more about its innate immune response toward infections. It has been shown that DENV is controlled by RNAi in Drosophila cells and studies revealed that DENV's interaction with RNAi are just as vital as siRNAs. Engineered transgenic Aedes aegypti mosquitos were shown to have resistance (caused by an RNAi response) against DENV-2 infections.
