= Chicken as biological research model =

Use of the bird species for research on live beings

Chickens (Gallus gallus domesticus) and their eggs have been used extensively as research models throughout the history of biology. Today they continue to serve as an important model for normal human biology as well as pathological disease processes.

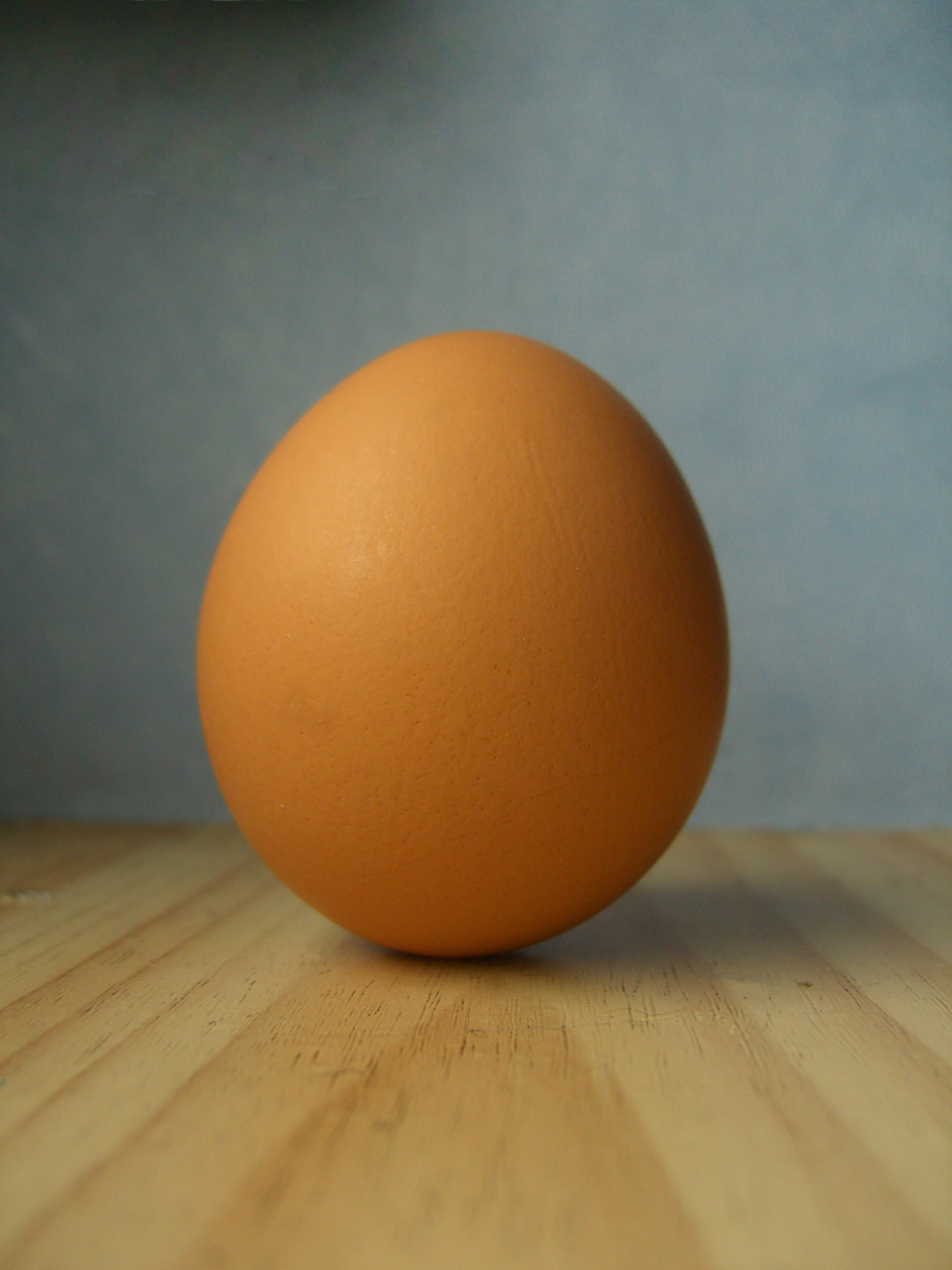
A chicken egg.

== History ==
=== Chicken embryos as a research model ===
Human fascination with the chicken and its egg are so deeply rooted in history that it is hard to say exactly when avian exploration began. As early as 1400 BCE, ancient Egyptians artificially incubated chicken eggs to propagate their food supply. The developing chicken in the egg first appears in written history after catching the attention of the famous Greek philosopher, Aristotle, around 350 BCE. As Aristotle opened chicken eggs at various time points of incubation, he noted how the organism changed over time. Through his writing of Historia Animalium, he introduced some of the earliest studies of embryology based on his observations of the chicken in the egg.

Aristotle recognized significant similarities between human and chicken development. From his studies of the developing chick, he was able to correctly decipher the role of the placenta and umbilical cord in the human.

Chick research of the 16th century significantly modernized ideas about human physiology. European scientists, including Ulisse Aldrovandi, Volcher Coiter and William Harvey, used the chick to demonstrate tissue differentiation, disproving the widely held belief of the time that organisms are "preformed" in their adult version and only grow larger during development. Distinct tissue areas were recognized that grew and gave rise to specific structures, including the blastoderm, or chick origin. Harvey also closely watched the development of the heart and blood and was the first to note the directional flow of blood between veins and arteries. The relatively large size of the chick as a model organism allowed scientists during this time to make these significant observations without the help of a microscope.

Expanding use of the microscope coupled with a new technique in the late 18th century unveiled the developing chick for close-up examination. By cutting a hole in the eggshell and covering it with another piece of shell, scientists were able to look directly into the egg while it continued to develop without dehydration. Soon studies of the developing chick identified the three embryonic germ layers: ectoderm, mesoderm and endoderm, giving rise to the field of embryology.

Host versus graft response was first described in the chicken embryo. Biologist James Murphy (1914) found that rat tissues that could not grow in adult chickens survived in the developing chick. In an immunocompetent animal, like the mature chicken, the host immune cells attack the foreign tissue. Since the immune system of the chick is not functional until about day 14 of incubation, foreign tissue can grow. Eventually, Murphy showed that the acceptance of tissue grafts was host-specific in immunologically competent animals.

Culturing virus was once technically difficult. In 1931, Ernest Goodpasture and Alice Miles Woodruff developed a new technique that used chicken eggs to propagate a pox virus. Building on their success, the chick was used to isolate the mumps virus for vaccine development and it is still used to culture some viruses and parasites today.

The ability of chicken embryonic nerves to infiltrate a mouse tumor suggested to Rita Levi-Montalcini that the tumor must produce a diffusible growth factor (1952). She identified nerve growth factor (NGF), leading to the discovery of a large family of growth factors which are key regulators during normal development and disease processes including cancer.

=== Adult chicken as a research model ===
The adult chicken has also made significant contributions to the advancement of science. By inoculating chickens with cholera bacteria (Pasteurella multocida) from an overgrown, and thereby attenuated culture, Louis Pasteur produced the first lab-derived attenuated vaccine (1860s). Great advances in immunology and oncology continued to characterize the 20th century, for which we indebted to the chicken model.

Peyton Rous (1879–1970) won the Nobel prize for discovering that viral infection of chicken could induce sarcoma (Rous, 1911). Steve Martin followed up on this work and identified a component of a chicken retrovirus, Src, which became the first known oncogene. J. Michael Bishop and Harold Varmus with their colleagues (1976) extended these findings to humans, showing that cancer-causing oncogenes in mammals are induced by mutations to proto-oncogenes.

Discoveries in the chicken ultimately divided the adaptive immune response into antibody (B-cell) and cell-mediated (T-cell) responses. Chickens missing their bursa, an organ with an unknown function at the time, could not be induced to make antibodies. Through these experiments, Bruce Glick correctly deduced that bursa was responsible for making the cells that produced antibodies. Bursa cells were termed B-cells for Bursa to differentiate them from thymus-derived T-cells.

=== Cancer ===
The chicken embryo is a unique model that overcomes many limitations to studying the biology of cancer in vivo. The chorioallantoic membrane (CAM), a well-vascularized extra-embryonic tissue located underneath the eggshell, has a successful history as a biological platform for the molecular analysis of cancer including viral oncogenesis, carcinogenesis, tumor xenografting, tumor angiogenesis, and cancer metastasis. Since the chicken embryo is naturally immunodeficient, the CAM readily supports the engraftment of both normal and tumor tissues. The avian CAM successfully supports most cancer cell characteristics including growth, invasion, angiogenesis, and remodeling of the microenvironment. The chicken egg model can be also used to evaluate various adverse effects (e.g., genotoxicity, histopathologic changes) produced by environmental chemicals, including carcinogens.

=== Genetics ===
The Gallus gallus genome was sequenced by Sanger shotgun sequencing and mapped with extensive BAC contig-based physical mapping. There are significant, fundamental similarities between the human and chicken genomes. However, differences between human and chicken genomes help to identify functional elements: the genes and their regulatory elements, which are most likely to be conserved through time. Publication of the chicken genome enables expansion of transgenic techniques for advancing research within the chick model system.
