= Blosnavirus =

Virus classification
- (unranked): Virus
- Realm: Riboviria
- Kingdom: Orthornavirae
- Phylum: incertae sedis
- Family: Birnaviridae
- Genus: Blosnavirus

Genus of viruses

Blosnavirus is a genus of viruses, in the family Birnaviridae. Blotched snakehead fish serve as natural hosts. There are two species in this genus.

== Taxonomy ==
The genus contains the following species:

- Blotched snakehead virus
- Lates calcarifer birnavirus

== Structure ==
Viruses in Blosnavirus are non-enveloped, with icosahedral and Single-shelled geometries, and T=13 symmetry. The diameter is around 70 nm. Genomes are linear and have 2 segments, around 2.7-3.4kb in length. The genome codes for 6 proteins.

Genus	Structure	Symmetry	Capsid	Genomic arrangement	Genomic segmentation
Blosnavirus	Icosahedral	T=13	Non-enveloped	Linear	Segmented

== Life cycle ==
Viral replication is cytoplasmic. Entry into the host cell is achieved by penetration into the host cell. Replication follows the double-stranded RNA virus replication model. Double-stranded RNA virus transcription is the method of transcription. Blotched snakehead fish serve as the natural host.

Genus	Host details	Tissue tropism	Entry details	Release details	Replication site	Assembly site	Transmission
Blosnavirus	Blotched snakehead fish	None	Unknown	Budding	Cytoplasm	Cytoplasm	Unknown
