= Entomobirnavirus =

Virus classification
- (unranked): Virus
- Realm: Riboviria
- Kingdom: Orthornavirae
- Phylum: incertae sedis
- Family: Birnaviridae
- Genus: Entomobirnavirus

Genus of viruses

Entomobirnavirus is a genus of viruses in the family Birnaviridae. Its natural host is the fly Drosophila melanogaster. There are two species in this genus.

== Taxonomy ==
The genus contains the following species:

- Drosophila X virus
- Mosquito X virus

== Structure ==
Viruses in the genus Entomobirnavirus are non-enveloped, with icosahedral and single-shelled geometries, and T=13 symmetry. The diameter is around 70 nm. Genomes are linear and segmented, around 15.3.2-3.5kb in length. The genome codes for 5 proteins.

Genus	Structure	Symmetry	Capsid	Genomic arrangement	Genomic segmentation
Entomobirnavirus	Icosahedral	T=13	Non-enveloped	Linear	Segmented

== Life cycle ==
Viral replication is cytoplasmic. Entry into the host cell is achieved by penetration into the host cell. Replication follows the double-stranded RNA virus replication model. Double-stranded rna virus transcription is the method of transcription. Drosophila melanogaster serve as the natural host.

Genus	Host details	Tissue tropism	Entry details	Release details	Replication site	Assembly site	Transmission
Entomobirnavirus	Insects: diptera	None	Cell receptor endocytosis	Budding	Cytoplasm	Cytoplasm	Unknown
