= Aquabirnavirus =

Virus classification
- (unranked): Virus
- Realm: Riboviria
- Kingdom: Orthornavirae
- Phylum: incertae sedis
- Family: Birnaviridae
- Genus: Aquabirnavirus

Species
- Infectious pancreatic necrosis virus; Tellina virus; Yellowtail ascites virus

Genus of viruses

Aquabirnavirus is a genus of viruses, in the family Birnaviridae. Salmonid fish serve as natural hosts. There are three species in this genus. A disease associated with this genus, Infectious pancreatic necrosis (IPN) in salmonid fish, causes significant losses to the aquaculture industry. Chronic infection in adults, and acute viral disease in young salmonid fish can occur.

== Taxonomy ==
The genus contains the following species:

- Infectious pancreatic necrosis virus
- Tellina virus
- Yellowtail ascites virus

== Structure ==
Viruses in Aquabirnavirus are non-enveloped, with icosahedral and single-shelled geometries, and T=13 symmetry. The diameter is around 70 nm. Genomes are linear and segmented, around 2.7-3kb in length. The genome codes for 5 proteins.

Genus	Structure	Symmetry	Capsid	Genomic arrangement	Genomic segmentation
Aquabirnavirus	Icosahedral	T=13	Non-enveloped	Linear	Segmented

== Life cycle ==
Viral replication is cytoplasmic. Entry into the host cell is achieved by penetration into the host cell. Replication follows the double-stranded RNA virus replication model. Double-stranded RNA virus transcription is the method of transcription. Salmonid fish serve as the natural host. Transmission routes are contact.

Genus	Host details	Tissue tropism	Entry details	Release details	Replication site	Assembly site	Transmission
Aquabirnavirus	Salmonid fish	None	Cell receptor endocytosis	Budding	Cytoplasm	Cytoplasm	Contact
