= James Bumgardner Murphy =

American physiologist (1884–1950)

James Bumgardner Murphy (4 August 1884 – 24 August 1950) was an American physiologist and anatomist who developed techniques for growing chicken and human tumor cells in fertilized chicken eggs, which is used in cancer studies as well as for maintaining virus cultures. He also recognized the role of the immune system, particularly lymphocytes, in the rejection of tissue grafts.

Murphy was born in Morgantown, North Carolina, where his father, psychiatrist Patrick Livingston Murphy, was director of the Western State Sanatorium. He grew up in Morgantown, and attended the Horner School before graduating from the University of North Carolina. He then joined Johns Hopkins Medical School in 1905, where he excelled in anatomical dissection and illustration, which impressed Harvey Cushing. He then worked as an assistant to Adolph Meyer and later joined the Rockefeller Institute to work under Peyton Rous in 1911. He developed techniques for growing mammalian tumor cells in embryonated hen's eggs. During World War I, Murphy worked in Washington with Hans Zinsser to organize mobile hospitals and helped develop an Army Medical Laboratory Manual. An ulcer, and a surgery with complications led to several years of poor health and convalescence. He became a director of cancer research at the Rockefeller Institute, working there until his death.

== See also ==
- Chicken as biological research model
