= Infectious pancreatic necrosis =

Infectious pancreatic necrosis virus

Virus classification
- (unranked): Virus
- Realm: Riboviria
- Kingdom: Orthornavirae
- Phylum: incertae sedis
- Family: Birnaviridae
- Genus: Aquabirnavirus
- Species: Infectious pancreatic necrosis virus

Viral disease of fish

Infectious pancreatic necrosis (IPN) is a severe viral disease of salmonid fish. It is caused by infectious pancreatic necrosis virus, which is a member of the Birnaviridae family. This disease mainly affects young salmonids such as trout or salmon of less than six months, although adult fish may carry the virus without showing symptoms. Resistance to infection develops more rapidly in warmer water. It is highly contagious and found worldwide, but some regions have managed to eradicate or greatly reduce the incidence of disease. The disease is normally spread horizontally via infected water, but spread also occurs vertically. It is unable to infect mammals.

== Clinical signs and diagnosis ==
A sharp rise in mortality is often seen (depending on the virulence of the disease). Other clinical signs include abdominal swelling, anorexia, abnormal swimming, darkening of the skin, and trailing of the feces from the vent. On necropsy, internal damage (viral necrosis) to the pancreas and thick mucus in the intestines often is present. Surviving fish should recover within one to two weeks.

Diagnostic methods for the detection of the disease include: characteristic histological pancreatic lesion, PCR, indirect fluorescent antibody testing, ELISA, and virus culture. High virus titers can be isolated from carrier animals.

== Treatment and control ==
Currently, no treatment is available. However, in certain territories vaccines are available for prevention of the disease e.g. Winvil 3 Micro.

Good husbandry measures, such as high water quality, low stocking density, and no mixing of batches, help to reduce disease incidence. To eradicate the disease, very strict protocol with regards to movement, water sources and stock replacement must be in place – and still it is difficult to achieve and comes at a high economic cost.
