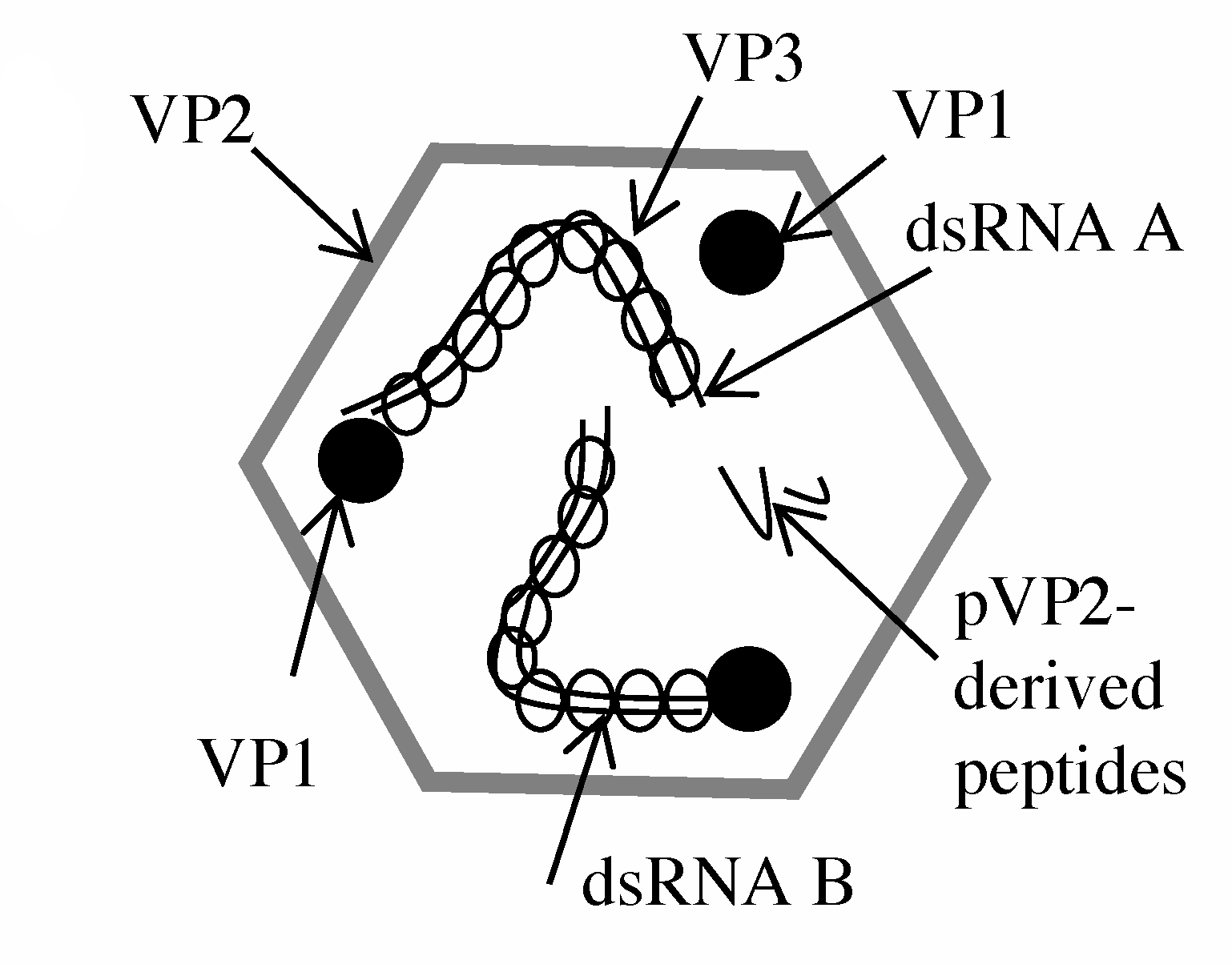
- Infectious bursal disease virus particle

Virus classification
- (unranked): Virus
- Realm: Riboviria
- Kingdom: Orthornavirae
- Phylum: incertae sedis
- Family: Birnaviridae

= Birnaviridae =

Family of viruses

Birnaviridae is a family of double-stranded RNA viruses. Salmonid fish, birds and insects serve as natural hosts. There are currently 11 species in this family, divided among seven genera. Diseases associated with this family include infectious pancreatic necrosis in salmonid fish, which causes significant losses to the aquaculture industry, with chronic infection in adult salmonid fish and acute viral disease in young salmonid fish.

== Structure ==
Viruses in family Birnaviridae are non-enveloped, with icosahedral single-shelled geometries, and T=13 symmetry. The diameter is around 70 nm.

== Genome ==
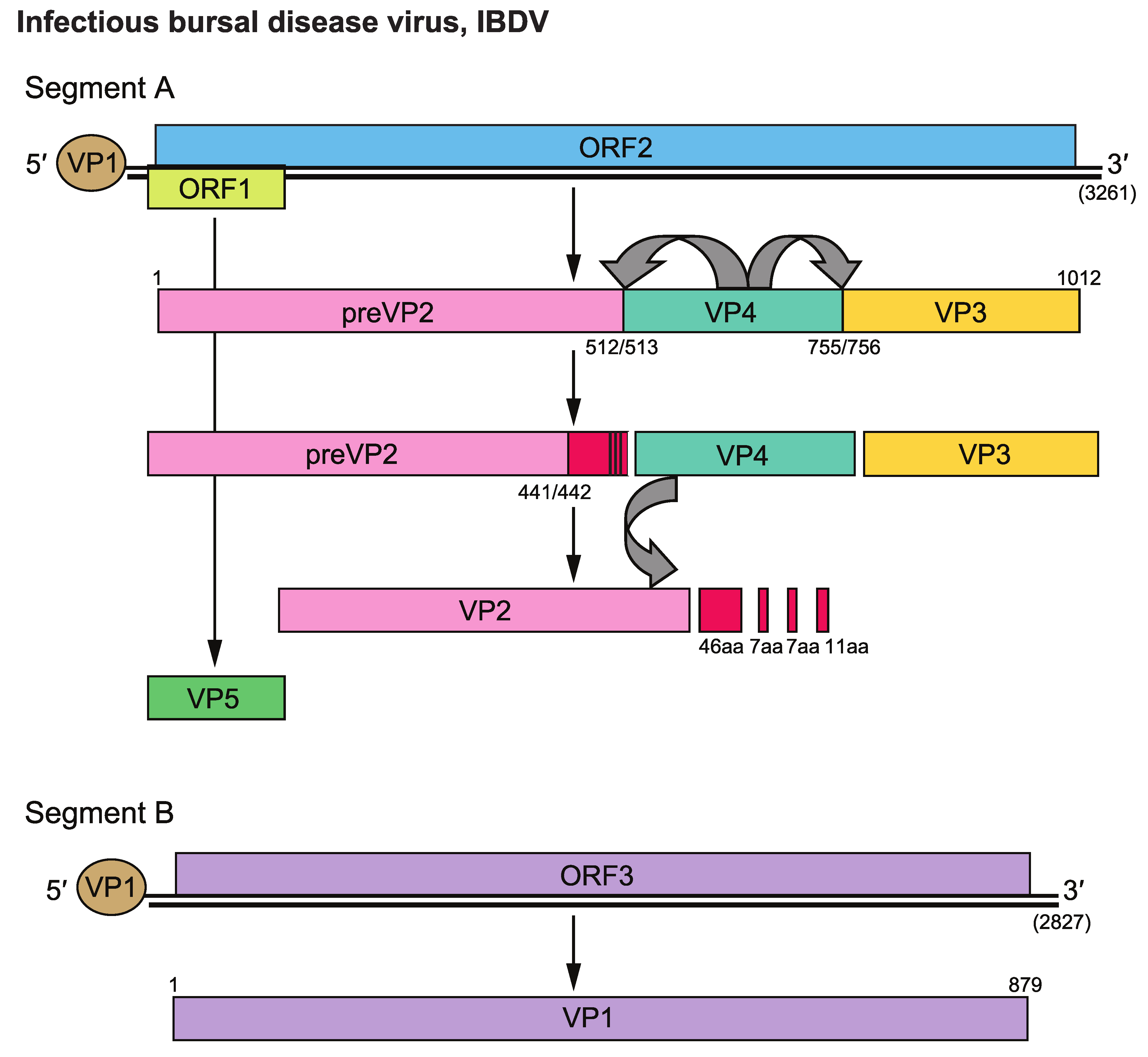
Genome of infectious bursal disease virus of family Birnaviridae

The genome is composed of linear, bi-segmented, double-stranded RNA. It is around 5.9–6.9 kbp in length and codes for five to six proteins. Birnaviruses encode the following proteins:

RNA-directed RNA polymerase (VP1), which lacks the highly conserved Gly-Asp-Asp (GDD) sequence, a component of the proposed catalytic site of this enzyme family that exists in the conserved motif VI of the palm domain of other RNA-directed RNA polymerases.

The large RNA segment, segment A, of birnaviruses codes for a polyprotein (N-VP2-VP4-VP3-C) that is processed into the major structural proteins of the virion: VP2, VP3 (a minor structural component of the virus), and into the putative protease VP4. VP4 protein is involved in generating VP2 and VP3. recombinant VP3 is more immunogenic than recombinant VP2.

Infectious pancreatic necrosis virus (IPNV), a birnavirus, is an important pathogen in fish farms. Analyses of viral proteins showed that VP2 is the major structural and immunogenic polypeptide of the virus. All neutralizing monoclonal antibodies are specific to VP2 and bind to continuous or discontinuous epitopes. The variable domain of VP2 and the 20 adjacent amino acids of the conserved C-terminal are probably the most important in inducing an immune response for the protection of animals.

Non structural protein VP5 is found in RNA segment A. VP5 is not essential for replication.

== Viral replication ==
Viral replication is cytoplasmic. Entry into the host cell is achieved by cell receptor endocytosis. Replication follows the double-stranded RNA virus replication model in the cytoplasm. Double-stranded RNA virus transcription is the method of transcription in cytoplasm. The virus is released by budding. Salmonid fish (Aquabirnavirus), young sexually immature chickens (Avibirnavirus), insects (Entomobirnavirus), and blotched snakehead fish (Blosnavirus) are the natural hosts. Transmission routes are contact.

== Taxonomy ==
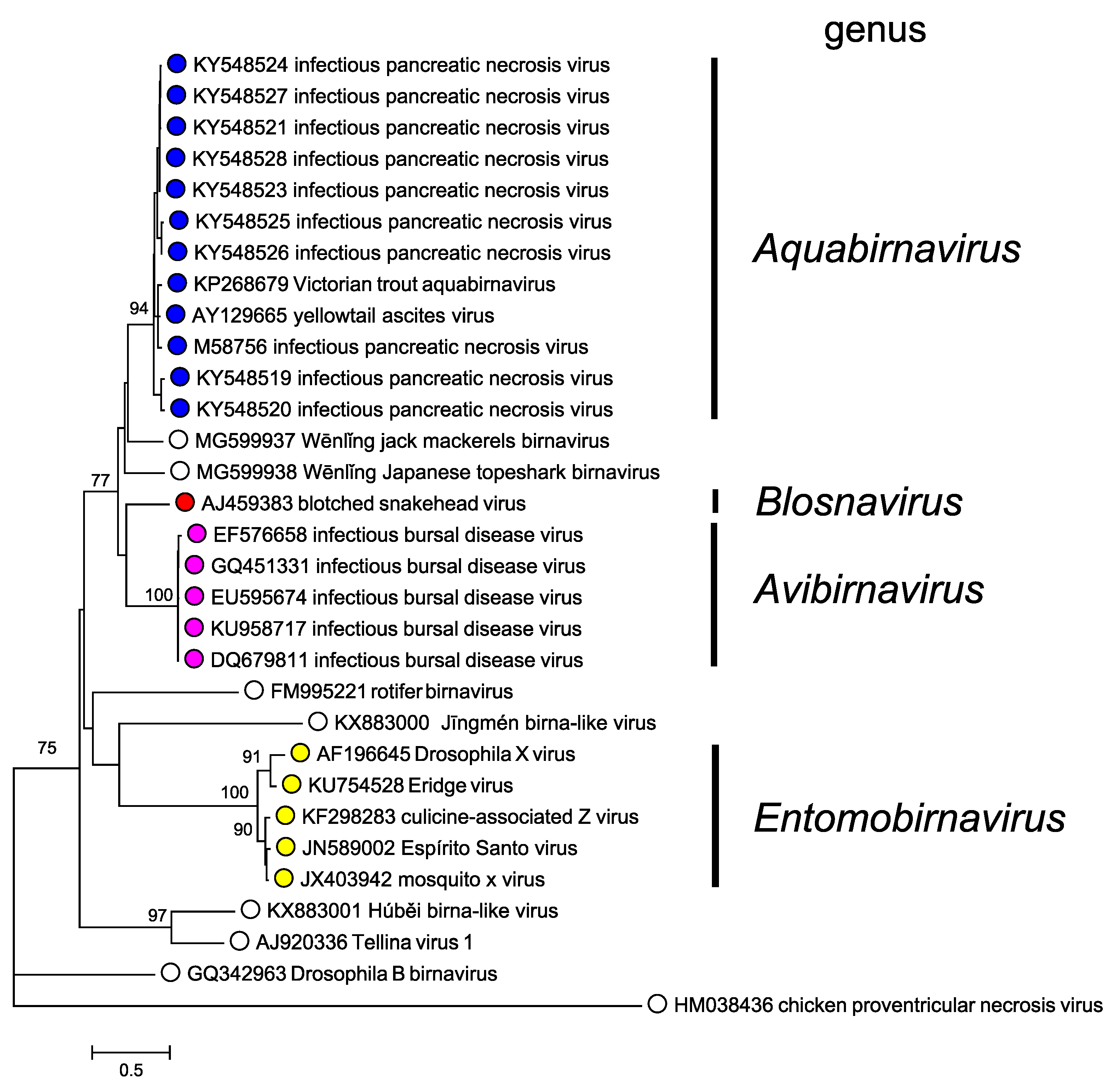
Phylogenetic tree of Birnaviridae

The following genera are recognized:

- Aquabirnavirus
- Avibirnavirus
- Blosnavirus
- Dronavirus
- Entomobirnavirus
- Ronavirus
- Telnavirus

== Phylogenetic position ==
A 2020 Yangshan Port metagenomic study found that the Birnaviridae and Permutotetraviridae RdRPs fall into Pisuviricota near the Partitiviridae after correcting for domain permutation. This treatment was supported by the presence of alternative permutations in sampled metagenomes belonging to the same branch.
