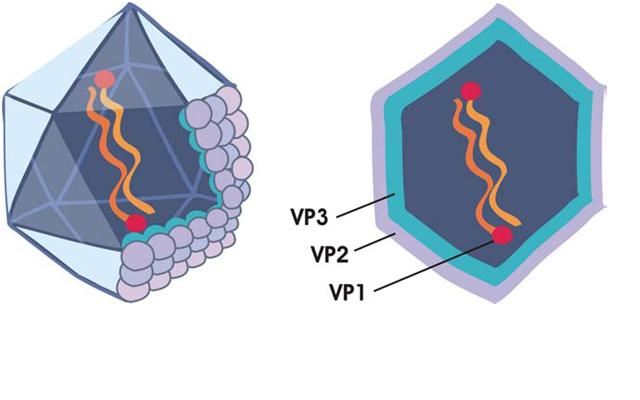
- Infectious pancreatic necrosis virus (IPNV) icosahedral structure and hexagonal profile; locations of proteins VP1, VP2, and VP3 are shown by arrows

Virus classification
- (unranked): Virus
- Realm: Riboviria
- Kingdom: Orthornavirae
- Phylum: incertae sedis
- Family: Birnaviridae
- Genus: Aquabirnavirus
- Species: Infectious pancreatic necrosis virus

= Infectious pancreatic necrosis virus =

RNA virus infecting salmonid fish

Infectious pancreatic necrosis virus (IPNV) is a double-stranded RNA virus from the family Birnaviridae, in the genus Aquabirnavirus. Causing the highly infectious disease Infectious pancreatic necrosis, the virus primarily affects young salmonids resulting in high mortality, occasionally surpassing 90 percent in the early stages. IPNV or IPNV-like viruses have been isolated worldwide from at least 32 families of saltwater and freshwater salmonids and non-salmonids fish including salmon, flatfish, pike, eels and others. Other aquatic organisms infected include 11 molluscs and 4 species of crustaceans. Due to its wide host range and high mortality, the virus is of great concern to global aquaculture. In addition to persistence in hosts, IPNV is also perpetual in the environment, surviving across a range of conditions and capable of infecting fish with as little as 10^{1} TCID_{50}/ml of the virus. Found in Europe, North America, South America, Africa, Asia, and Australia, the virus has led to significant losses in the mariculture of Atlantic salmon, brook trout, and rainbow trout.

First described in 1940 in farmed trout, IPNV outbreaks occur primarily in fry as the most susceptible stage, first in freshwater and then again after a transfer to seawater as post-smolts. Survivors as asymptomatic carriers pose a significant threat to continued outbreaks through both horizontal and vertical transmission of the virus by way of excreted matter. The virus is classified into serogroups A and B, with group A containing nine serotypes and B one serotype. With a virion 65-70 nm in diameter and icosahedral structure, the genome of the virus is split into two segments of double-stranded RNA, encoding 5 proteins. An infection of the host is often identified based on visual inspection, with various key external and internal characteristics. A commonly used molecular biological method of diagnosis is RT-PCR assays. Attempts at controlling IPNV have included the reduction of horizontal and vertical transmission, vaccinations, and selective breeding.

== Classification ==
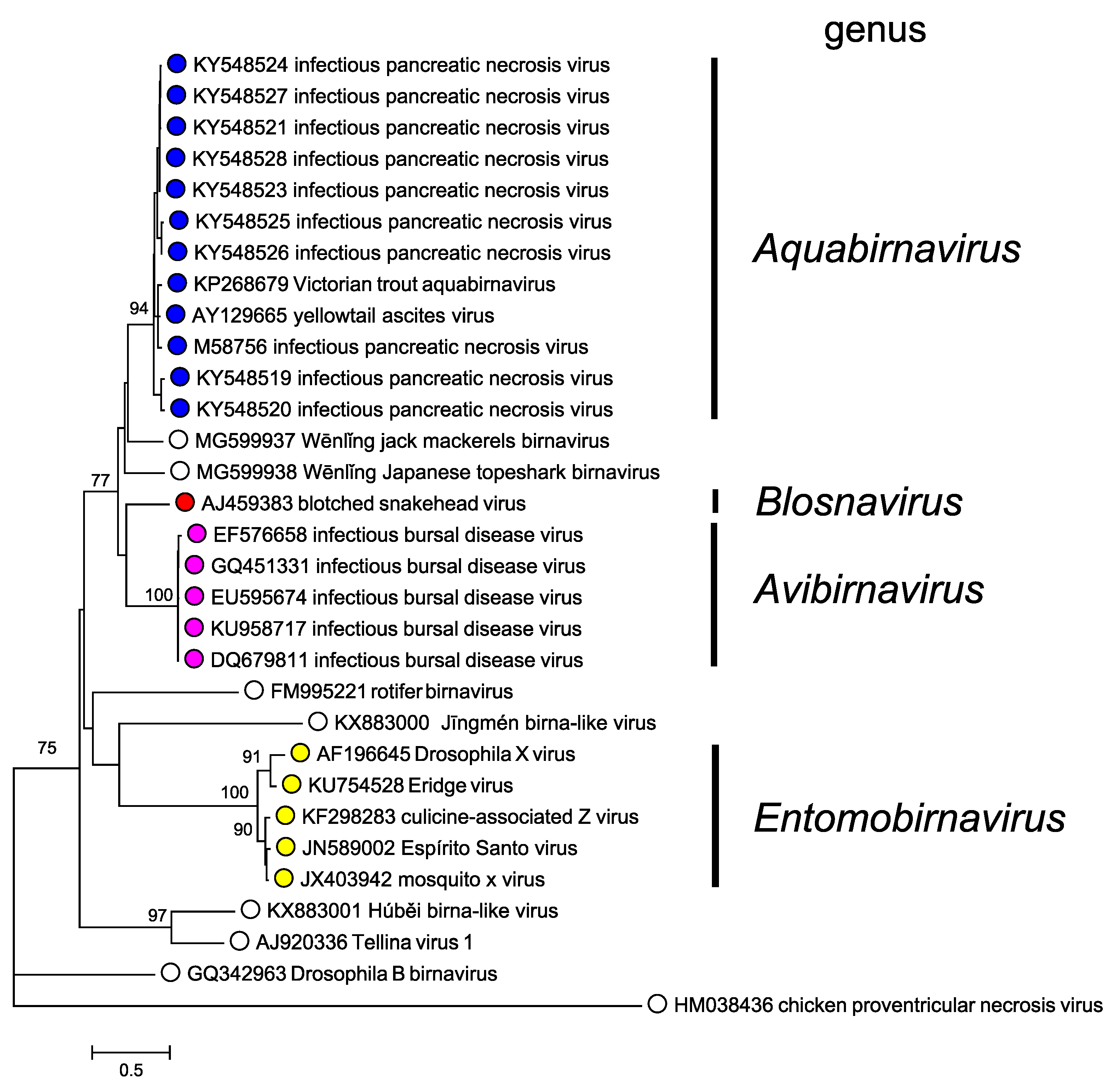
Phylogenetic tree of Birnaviridae. The genus of infectious pancreatic necrosis virus (IPNV), Aquabirnavirus, is shown on the top.

Infectious pancreatic necrosis disease virus (IPNV) causes infectious pancreatic necrosis disease (IPN) in fish – most disease has been documented in young, farmed salmonid fish.

Infectious pancreatic necrosis disease virus (IPNV) is a bi-segmented, double-stranded RNA virus belonging to the Aquabirnavirus subgroup of the Birnaviridae. IPNV's virion has a hexagonal profile without envelopes, and a diameter of approximately 60 nm. To date, only two other Aquabirnavirus are listed by the International Committee on Taxonomy of Viruses (ICTV), the Tellina virus and the Yellowtail ascites virus.

=== Serotypes ===
As a member of Aquabirnavirus, IPNV is divided into two serogroups, A and B, each containing numbered serotypes. Within serogroup A, Serotype A1 includes variants like VR-299 and the Buhl strain found in the US. Serotypes A2 to A5 have been found in Europe and serotypes A6 to A9 have been found in Canada. Serogroup B is made up of a single variant called TV-1.

=== Segments ===
Infectious pancreatic necrosis virus has two segmented RNA genomes, segments A and B.

Segment A contains the genetic information necessary to produce the polyprotein, consisting of genes pVP2, VP3, VP4, and VP5. Segment A also contains virulence factors.

Segment B contains genetic information for creating an RNA-dependent RNA polymerase enzyme made of VP1.

The composition of the surface of virus particles involves a specific area of the capsid protein VP2 linked to host specificity, virulence and serotype.

== Microbiology ==
=== Structure ===
Infectious pancreatic necrosis virus is 65-70 nm in diameter, with icosahedral structure. It has unenveloped, single-shelled icosahedrons. Its buoyant density is 1.33 grams per cm^{3}. Similar to other Birnaviruses, it has a single T = 13 icosahedral cell and no inner capsid. The shell is made up of 120 subunits of a coat protein.

=== RNA ===
Infectious pancreatic necrosis virus has 2 segments of double-stranded RNA, segment A and segment B. Segment A is 3097 base pairs long, and has two partially overlapping open reading frames, one large and one small. Segment B is 2784 base pairs long and has one open reading frame.

=== Proteins ===
Viral RNA encodes proteins VP1, VP2, VP3 and VP3a, VP4, VP5, and VP1-RNA-dependant RNA polymerase. VP1, the largest protein at 94 kDa, is responsible for the synthesis of viral mRNA. The 5' end of the RNA is bonded to a serine residue in the VPg via a phosphodiester bond, allowing the VPg to act as a cap substitute during translation. VP2 (54 kDa) is the main structural protein, and is responsible for cell attachment. VP3 and VP3a are the most abundant polypeptides, though due to their smaller size (31 kDa and 29 kDa, respectfully), they contribute less to the overall viral mass than VP2. VP3 and VP3a have 3 important roles in morphogenesis: it interacts with V2 (the capsid protein), associates with the viral genome, and recruits polymerase into capsids. VP4 converts pre-VP2 to capsid protein VP2, while VP5 is likely related to gene expression.

=== Replication ===
A single cycle of replication of IPNV, which takes place in the cytoplasm, takes 16–20 hours at 22 degrees Celsius. This falls within the optimal temperature for replication, which is between 20 and 24 degrees Celsius. Replication is slow or completely halted in cells above 24 degrees Celsius.

== History ==
=== Discovery ===
In 1940, the first pancreatic necrosis symptom was found in Canada's farmed Atlantic salmon, Salvelinus fontinalis, resulting in significant losses of juvenile trout. In the 1950s, the same symptom was observed in Oncorhynchus mykiss in the United States, and the fish disease was named infectious pancreatic necrosis (IPN). Shortly after, the infection expanded to Europe.

=== Virus identification and isolation ===
In 1960, Dr Wolf from Eastern Fish Disease Laboratory in the United States successfully identified the unknown disease cause and isolated the virus from fish cells. The infectious agent responsible for IPN was discovered to be a small, non-enveloped, icosahedral virus belonging to the Birnaviridae family, and it was named infectious pancreatic necrosis virus (IPNV). Since its discovery, IPNV has been acknowledged globally as a critical pathogen for salmonid fish, resulting in high death rates in juvenile fish and causing economic losses in the aquaculture sector.

After the first isolation of the infectious pancreatic necrosis virus, scientists in different countries isolated the virus using Dr Wolf's technique.

After the first detection of IPNV outside the Salmonidae family in 1972, IPNV has been found in diverse fish families, including various salmonid species such as rainbow trout, Atlantic salmon, coho salmon, chinook salmon, and brown trout, as well as other fish species such as turbot, halibut, and spotted wolffish. By 1995, IPNV had been recorded in 32 fish families, 11 mollusc families, and 4 crustacea families.

=== History in Europe ===
In Europe, the first strain of IPNV was isolated in 1971. A study has shown that the strain found in Europe has distinct antigenic properties compared to the VR229 strain.

=== History in Norway ===
In Norway, the initial isolation of IPNV occurred in 1975 from freshwater rainbow trout. Infectious pancreatic necrosis (IPN) was categorized as a notifiable disease between 1991 and 2008 in Norway.

=== History in Japan ===
In 1964, the symptom of infectious pancreatic necrosis was observed among farmed juvenile Oncorhynchus mykiss in Nagano and Shizuoka, Japan.

Using Dr Wolf's technique previously mentioned, Dr Sano isolated the virus from fish cells and identified that IPNV caused the fish's symptoms. After Sano's finding, the farms imposed several preventive measures by raising fish roe and juvenile fish separately and sanitization. The occurrence of IPN peaked in 1972 but has decreased since then. By the 1980s, IPN had become a sporadic viral disease among fish in Japan due to the selective breeding of healthier fish and increasing in the virus variants with lower pathogenicity.

== Host interactions ==
=== Transmission ===
Predominantly infecting young salmonids, infectious pancreatic necrosis virus (IPNV) outbreaks occur both in fingerlings and parr (freshwater stage) and later as post-smolts weeks after transfer to seawater. IPNV can persist in subclinical infections in fish, which can act as reservoirs for the virus. This persistence in particular tissues appears possible due to the reduction of replication in both high and low virulence strains, allowing the virus to evade detection by the host immune defences These carriers are typically life-long spreaders, posing a danger to other healthy fish either through recurrence of the disease within the carrier under stress, or as sources of horizontal and vertical transmission.

Horizontal transmission takes place when IPNV-carrier fish shed the virus in urine and feces, increasing during stress. Entry into the host can occur once or multiple times via the gills, across intestinal epithelial cells, or through skin absorption. Once inside, the precise pathways used in the cellular absorption of the virus are largely contested, however, a recent study proposes the involvement of the protein non-muscle myosin heavy chain 9 (Myh9), allowing viral entry. Myh9’s conservation across many of the hosts of IPNV is speculated to contribute to the extensive host range of the virus.

Another exit for the virus is through reproductive fluids to offspring (eggs) during vertical transmission. Progeny become infected with IPNV through gonadal fluids from both mature male and female broodstock. This has been observed in Brook trout and Rainbow trout, but has yet to be proven in Atlantic salmon, although it is suspected.

Long distance waterborne transmission IPNV may also be possible as the virus remains viable in marine, freshwater and sediments for several months. Once introduced, the virus is stable across a wide range of pH (3-9) and temperature, making it resistant to many disinfectants. In one case, the virion was found to still be viable after remaining at 60 C for 60 minutes. Long distance transmission raises risks of farm to wild transmission as has already been observed during the infection of resident fish downstream of a farm experiencing an outbreak.

Other sources of transmission of the virus include wild birds, farmed escapes, and transport between farms (infected eggs, feed, equipment, inventory) alongside waterborne and within fish groups (vertical and horizontal transmission) discussed above. In addition to carriers and sources of transfer, the ability of the virus to infect such a wide range of species creates endemic areas for IPNV.

=== Clinical symptoms ===
==== External ====
Monitoring in farms by visual inspection is often used to identify outbreaks of acute cases of infectious pancreatic necrosis virus. Common initial symptoms are loss of appetite and depression in infected fish. Other changes to appearance also occur, including darkened skin, pale gills, exophthalmia and a distended abdomen. Skin haemorrhages caused by the virus can also be seen on the belly. Fish suffering from the disease display abnormal behaviour and swimming patterns, namely periods of excitation seen in whirling movements followed by sinking in a depression period. IPNV-carrier fish display no clinical sign of the virus, making visual detection of persistent infection ineffectual.

==== Internal ====
Within infected fish, damage to almost all organs is visible, specifically necrosis of and lesions in the pancreas and multifocal necrosis in the liver, which is pale in appearance. Kidneys, spleen (clusters of monocytes), gallbladder (enlarged) and gastrointestinal tract (white mucus) are also affected. Ascites result in an accumulation of yellowish-clear fluid, enlarging the abdomen. Infection by the virus also seemingly produces physiological responses within the skeletal system of salmonid fish. While these symptoms are common due rapid spread of the virus in the blood, pathological changes to specific organs vary with age and species of fish as well as viral strain.

=== Mortality ===
Reported mortality rates of farmed fry in freshwater and seawater phases differ, with the freshwater phase ranging from minimal to nearly 100% and the seawater phase resulting in 10-20% death of infected fish. Host, environmental and virus characteristics influence observed mortality rates. Highest mortality is typically seen in young salmonids, decreasing with increasing body weight. Other factors such as species, health of the fish and genetic differences leading to variation in susceptibility. Environmental conditions influence acute infection through stressors such as temperature and water quality, causing outbreaks in asymptomatic fish. Additionally, high packing of fish in aquaculture also induces stress and creates optimal conditions for virus transmission and evolution.

Viral properties that contribute to persistence and mortality of hosts includes the broad range of virus serotypes and strains, as well as viral loads associated with each grouping of virus. This variation affects the efficiency of horizontal transfer of the virus, with highly virulent strains more effective than variations with low virulence. Additionally the stability of the virus across a range of temperature, pH and salinity and ability to infect many different hosts makes IPNV persevering both in environments and hosts. Viral persistence in alternative hosts and environment across a range of conditions, creates conditions in which the virus remain a long-term threat. Differences in virulence (10%-90%) of strains alongside variations in host characteristics and environmental stressors are all influential for mortality rates caused by the virus.

== Diagnosis ==
At present, infectious pancreatic necrosis virus has been reported in Europe, North America, South America, South Africa, Asia, and Australia, where it is a major threat to aquaculture due to its wide host range and high mortality. As such, there has been a widespread push to find an accurate and rapid technique to identify the virus. Current methods of diagnosis fall into categories of clinical symptoms (described above), laboratory testing and case history. Visual inspection is of most use for young salmonids but is inadequate to detect asymptomatic carriers.

Laboratory examinations using molecular biological processes vary but often include flow cytometry, cell culture, histology, and immunological methods. ELISA is a commonly used technique as it allows for the detection of the viral antigens using infected tissue samples. However, tests like ELISA and immunohistochemistry have been criticised, for the requirement of fresh samples and high viral titre needed. More recent studies have proposed the use of the more efficient and rapid RT-PCR and its variants to test for IPNV. It has also been suggested that due to a high viral load in the pectoral fins of infected fish, RT-PCR assays could be a non-lethal alternative of detection. A proposed combination of RT-PCR and flow cytometry claims to be effectual at identification the virus in titres of 1 × 10^{2} and 1 × 10^{3} TCID_{50}/ml, compared to standard 1 × 10^{4} TCID_{50}/ml concentration commonly used. Other modern methods for early identification have also been put forward, including biosensors and RT-LAMP.

== Treatment and control ==
There have been a variety of attempts to reduce transmission and increase protection against infectious pancreatic necrosis virus (IPNV). Selective breeding, as well as vaccination, have both been shown to be viable ways of at least reducing infection rates.

Horizontal transmission (transmission between individuals of the same generation) can be reduced by zoning and separation of different areas, surveillance of fish, and removing all fish affected by infectious pancreatic necrosis conditions. Vertical transmission (transmission from one generation to the next) can be reduced by not using survivors of infection to breed and removing any affected individuals in the breeding stock.

Since infectious pancreatic necrosis virus vaccination research has begun, different types of vaccines, as well as different methods of vaccination, have been tried. Broad-scale oral vaccination of young fish is likely to be the best method, as injection of hundreds of fry is impractical. However, vaccine effectiveness can be limited when young fish are vaccinated, because the fish immune system has not fully developed until after the fry stage. Still, there is promising work on vaccinations. Some antigens may be degraded in the digestive system after oral ingestion, presenting another potential problem. However, lactic acid bacteria can be used in a vaccine, and has been shown to significantly lower the amount of IPNV in rainbow trout populations. There is also the possibility of using virus-like particles (VLP’s) as a vaccine agent, which has been shown to have high potential. Selective breeding has been massively successful in reducing mortality and spread of IPNV. In Atlantic salmon, resistance has been shown to be conferred by variations in one singular gene, although since, previously-resistant fish have been infected and killed by a new IPNV strain.
