= Bruce Glick =

American poultry scientist (1927–2009)

- Born: May 5, 1927
- Died: February 19, 2009 (aged 81)
- Resting place: Atlanta, Georgia
- Education: Rutgers University, University of Massachusetts, Ohio State University
- Known for: Bursa of Fabricius
- Scientific career
- Fields: poultry science
- Doctoral advisor: George Jaap
- Other academic advisors: Paul Sturkie, J. Robert Smyth Jr.

Bruce Glick (May 5, 1927 - February 19, 2009) was a poultry scientist known for discovering the role of antibody production in the Bursa of Fabricius.

== Early life and education ==
Bruce Glick grew up in Pittsburgh, Pennsylvania and was interested in birds as a child. His father, Peter Glick, was the Secretary of Labor for Pennsylvania. Glick served in World War II. He went to Rutgers University and studied birds majoring in poultry science, graduating in 1951. In 1950 he married Kay McCall. He received an M.S. degree from the University of Massachusetts in genetics in 1952 and attended Ohio State University as a Ph.D. student, graduating with a PhD in physiology in 1955. While there, he worked on determining the purpose of the Bursa of Fabricius, a gland that he was able to remove from a goose without any apparent effect.

A fellow graduate student, Timothy Chang, worked with Glick's geese in a different study, and noticed that the birds without the Bursa of Fabricius did not produce expected antibodies. Glick and Chang wrote up the results of this study and were unable to get it published in Science, so it was published in Poultry Science in 1956. Their publication, considered a landmark paper, is one of the most cited works from Poultry Science.

== Career ==
After graduating, Glick joined Mississippi State University Poultry Science Department and became a professor. There, he directed grant efforts that funded the MSU Poultry Science Building expansion. In 1986 he became head of the Poultry Science Department at Clemson University. He worked with the South Carolina Poultry Federation and created opportunities for faculty members to work with the state poultry industry.

Glick continued to study the Bursa of Fabricius throughout his career. He wrote 225 scientific papers, review articles, and book chapters, and mentored 29 graduate students and 17 postdoctoral fellows. His work received grant support from the National Institutes of Health, National Science Foundation, National Cancer Institute and the U.S. Department of Agriculture. He worked on research to understand the bursal secretory dendritic cell, a cell that "alerts" the immune system to the presence of antigens so they can be recognized by defender cells.

Scientists building on Glick's work combined bursectomy with thymectomy to demonstrate that the bursa controlled immune responses associated with circulating antibodies, whereas the thymus controlled cellular immunity. Chicken research was the first source of the two-component (B cells and T cells concept) of immunity. Scientists building on this work, including Robert A. Good, would improve cancer treatments; once B cells were shown to be the source of antibodies, scientists could create monoclonal antibodies which could be targeted towards certain antigens. The knowledge of the bursa function helped to facilitate the technique of administering chicken vaccines while the chicken was still in the egg. Glick retired from Clemson in 1995.

== Honors and awards ==
Glick received the Merck Award for Research in Poultry Science in 1978. In 1979, Current Contents gave him a citation classic award for the large number of citations to his 1956 article. The Poultry Science Association elected him a fellow in 1986. In 2014, he was inducted into the Mississippi Poultry Hall of Fame. In 2018, he was recognized with the Golden Goose Award from the American Association for the Advancement of Science for his work.
