= Bursa of Fabricius =

Specialized organ in birds

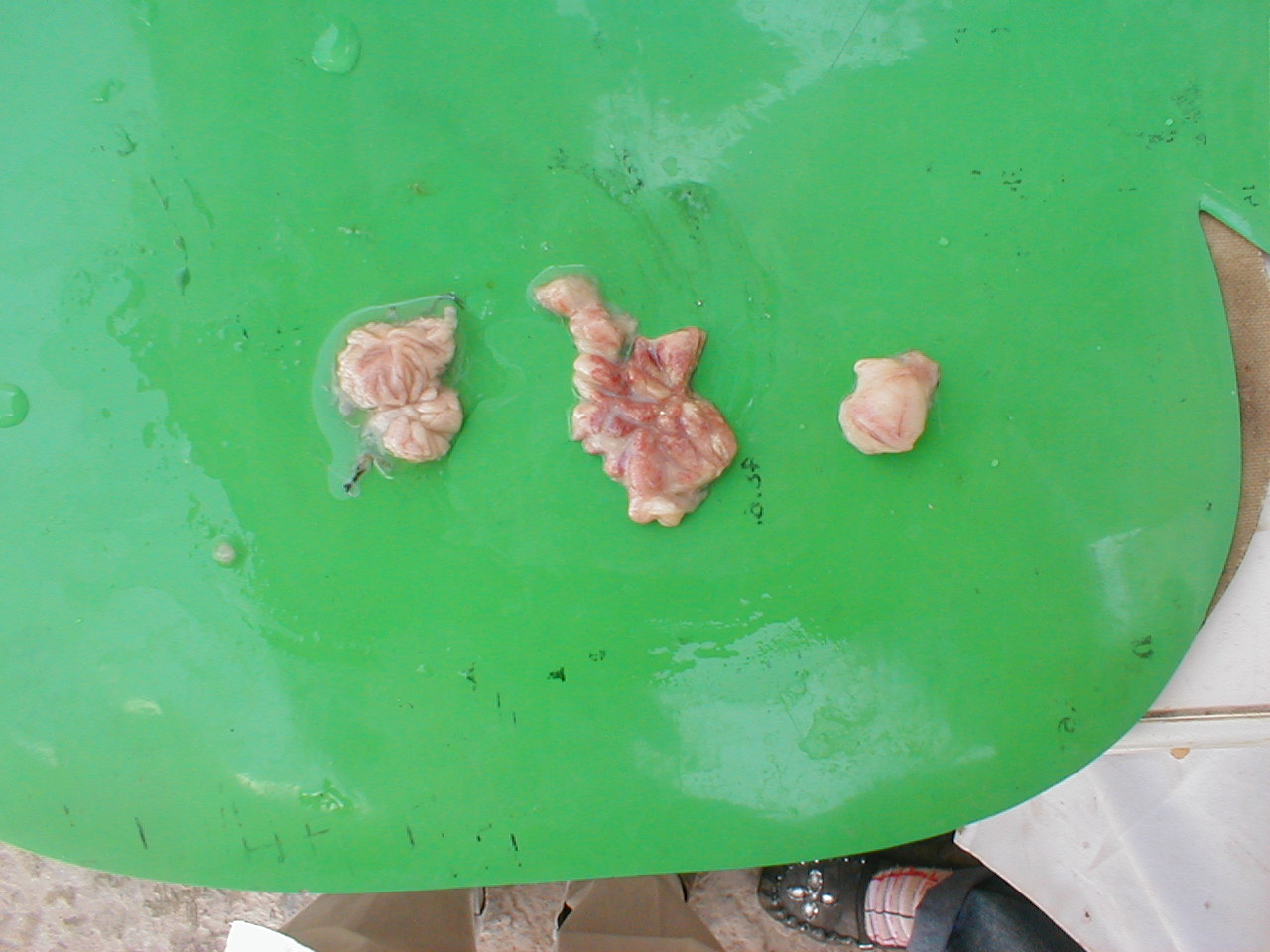
3 bursa of Fabricius opened : left : chronic inflamation; middle : acute inflamation; right : normal

In birds, the bursa of Fabricius (Latin: bursa cloacalis or bursa Fabricii) is the site of hematopoiesis. It is a specialized organ that, as first demonstrated by Bruce Glick and later by Max Dale Cooper and Robert Good, is necessary for B cell (part of the immune system) development in birds. Mammals generally do not have an equivalent organ; the bone marrow is often the site of both hematopoiesis and B cell development. The bursa is present in the cloaca of birds and is named after Hieronymus Fabricius, who described it in 1621.

== Description ==
The bursa is an epithelial and lymphoid organ that is found only in birds. The bursa develops as a dorsal diverticulum of the proctodeal region of the cloaca. The luminal (interior) surface of the bursa is plicated with as many as 15 primary and 7 secondary plicae or folds. These plicae have hundreds of bursal follicles containing follicle-associated epithelial cells, lymphocytes, macrophages, and plasma cells. Lymphoid stem cells migrate from the fetal liver to the bursa during ontogeny. In the bursa, these stem cells acquire the characteristics of mature, immunocompetent B cells. The bursa is active in young birds. It atrophies after about six months.

== Research history ==
In 1956, Bruce Glick showed that removal of the bursa in newly hatched chicks severely impaired the ability of the adult birds to produce antibodies. In contrast, removal of the bursa in adult chickens has little effect on the immune system. This was a serendipitous discovery that came about when a fellow graduate, Timothy S. Chang, who was teaching a course on antibody production obtained chickens from Glick that had been bursectomised (removal of the bursa). When these chickens failed to produce antibody in response to an immunization with Staphylococcus bacteria, the two students realized that the bursa is necessary for antibody production. Their initial attempts to publish their findings were thwarted by an editor who commented that "further elucidation of the mechanism ... should be attempted before publication.”

The role of the thymus in the immune response was also identified shortly after the discovery of bursa's role in antibody responses. In thymectomized animals, the ability to reject allografts, and to mount delayed hypersensitivity responses, was drastically reduced. By the mid-1960s, immunologists were convinced that there were indeed two separate arms of the immune system: one dealing exclusively with the production of circulating antibodies (humoral immunity), and another that is involved in the delayed hypersensitivity-type reactions and graft rejections (cell-mediated immunity).

== Diseases ==
Infectious bursal disease (IBD) is a viral disease in poultry. Typically, the virus attacks the bursa of young birds, preventing development of the immune system.
